= List of 4000-series integrated circuits =

The following is a list of CMOS 4000-series digital logic integrated circuits. In 1968, the original 4000-series was introduced by RCA. Although more recent parts are considerably faster, the 4000 devices operate over a wide power supply range (3 V to 18 V recommended range for "B" series) and are well suited to unregulated battery-powered applications and interfacing with sensitive analogue electronics, where the slower operation may be an EMC advantage. The earlier datasheets included the internal schematics of the gate architectures, and a number of novel designs are able to "mis-use" this additional information to provide semi-analog functions for timing skew and linear signal amplification. Due to the popularity of these parts, other manufacturers released pin-to-pin compatible logic devices and kept the 4000 sequence number as an aid to identification of compatible parts. However, other manufacturers use different prefixes and suffixes on their part numbers, and not all devices are available from all sources or in all package sizes.

== Overview ==
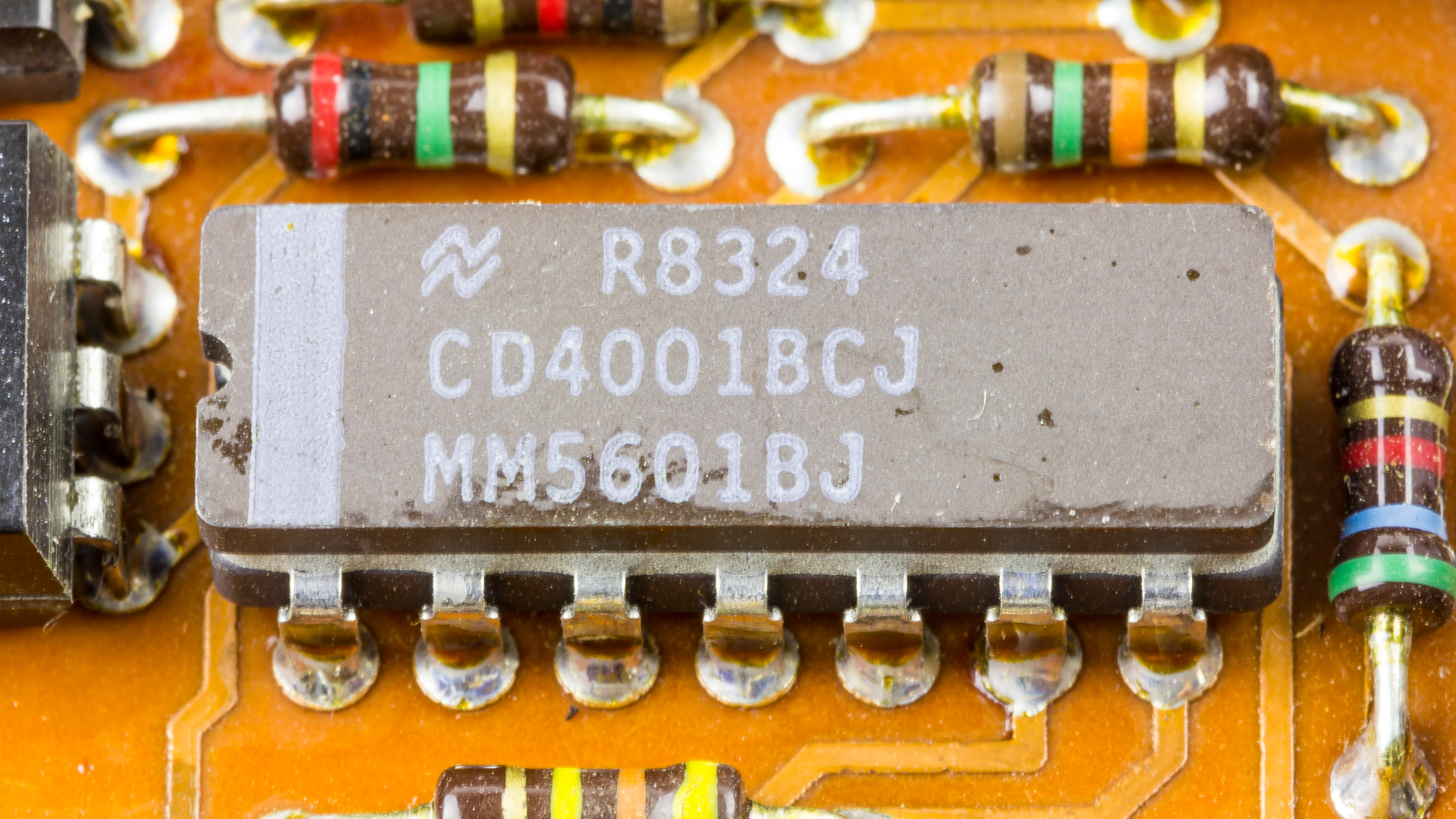
CD4001B quad 2-input NOR gate in DIP-14 package, manufactured by National Semiconductor in 1983

Non-exhaustive list of manufacturers which make or have made these kind of ICs.

Current manufacturers of these ICs:

- Texas Instruments (acquired National Semiconductor)
- ON Semiconductor (spinoff of Motorola Semiconductor Components Group. Acquired Fairchild Semiconductor)
- Nexperia (spinoff from NXP)

Previous manufacturers:

- Hitachi
- NXP (acquired Philips Semiconductors)
- RCA (defunct; first introduced this 4000-series family in 1968)
- Renesas Electronics (acquired Intersil)
- ST Microelectronics
- Toshiba Semiconductor
- VEB Kombinat Mikroelektronik (defunct; was active in the 1980s)
- Tesla Piešťany, s.p. (defunct; was active in the 1980s and 1990s)
- various manufacturers in the former Soviet Union (e.g. Angstrem, Mikron Group, Exiton, Splav, NZPP in Russia; Mezon in Moldavia; Integral in Byelorussia; Oktyabr in Ukraine; Billur in Azerbaijan)

== Logic gates ==
Pinout of 4049 hex inverter gates, pinout-compatible with 4050 buffer

Pinout of 4093 quad 2-input NAND gates with Schmitt-trigger inputs, pinout-compatible with 4011

Since there are numerous 4000-series parts, this section groups related combinational logic parts to make it easier for the reader to choose part numbers.

All parts in this section have normal inputs and push-pull outputs, unless stated differently.

One input voltage translation gates:

- 40109 = Quad buffer (dual power rails) (logic can step up or down, depending on power-rail choice)
- 4504 = Hex buffer (dual power rails) (logic can step up or down, depending on power-rail choice)

One input logic gates:

- 4041 = Quad buffer/inverter, each input has 2 outputs: Q and Q̅ (outputs can drive one TTL / two 74LS / four CMOS loads)
- 4050 = Hex buffer (outputs can drive two TTL / four 74LS / eight CMOS loads) (note: VDD power rail pin at non-typical location)
- 4049 = Hex inverter (outputs can drive two TTL / four 74LS / eight CMOS loads) (note: VDD power rail pin at non-typical location)
- 4069 = Hex inverter
- 40106 = Hex inverter with Schmitt-trigger inputs (pinout-compatible with 4069)
- 4572 = Quad inverter, plus a 2-onput NOR gate and a 2-input NAND gate (both can be converted into inverters)

Two to eight input logic gates:

- 4093 = Quad 2-input NAND with Schmitt-trigger inputs (pinout-compatible with 4011)
- 40107 = Dual 2-input NAND with open-drain outputs (can drive 32 CMOS loads) (DIP-8 package)

Configuration	AND	NAND	OR	NOR	XOR	XNOR
Quad 2-input	4081	4011	4071	4001	4070	4077
Triple 3-input	4073	4023	4075	4025	—N/a	—N/a
Dual 4-input	4082	4012	4072	4002	—N/a	—N/a
Single 8-input	4068	4068	4078	4078	—N/a	—N/a

Note: The 4068 and 4078 has two outputs: Q and Q̅. The 4048 is an 8-input gate too (see below). The 4572 has a NOR gate and NAND gate (see above).

AND-OR-invert (AOI) logic gates:

- 4085 = Dual 2-wide 2-input AND-OR-invert (AOI). This dual 2-2 AOI gate reduces the boolean expression A̅B̅ + C̅D̅ to 1st output and E̅F̅ + G̅H̅ to 2nd output.
- 4086 = Single expandable 4-wide 2-input AND-OR-invert (AOI). This single expandable 2-2-2-2 AOI gate reduces the boolean expression A̅B̅ + C̅D̅ + E̅F̅ + G̅H̅ + E̅X̅P̅A̅N̅D̅, where EXPAND is the output from another AOI gate.
- 4048 = Single expandable 8-input 8-function with three-state output, 8 choices for gate type: 8 NOR / 8 OR / 8 NAND / 8 AND / 4-4 AND-OR-invert / 4-4 AND-OR / 4-4 OR-AND-invert / 4-4 OR-AND
  When configured as AND-OR-invert (AOI) gate, it reduces the boolean expression A̅B̅C̅D̅ + E̅F̅G̅H̅ + E̅X̅P̅A̅N̅D̅.
  When configured as AND-OR (AO) gate, it reduces the boolean expression ABCD + EFGH + EXPAND.
  When configured as NOR gate, it reduces the boolean expression A̅ + B̅ + C̅ + D̅ + E̅ + F̅ + G̅ + H̅ + E̅X̅P̅A̅N̅D̅, which is a 9-input NOR gate when EXPAND is used as a 9th input.
  When configured as OR gate, it reduces the boolean expression A + B + C + D + E + F + G + H + EXPAND, which is a 9-input OR gate when EXPAND is used as a 9th input.

Note: The 4041 can simplify AOI boolean expression implementations by providing buffered A, B, C, D and A̅, B̅, C̅, D̅.

== Parts list ==
This list consists mostly of part numbers from a 1983 RCA databook, though the leading "CD" and tailing letters (A, B, UB) have been removed for generic part number use. The numeric portion of part numbers from some manufactures may not be identical to generic part numbers in this table. Motorola typically prepended a "1" and removed the first "0" from part numbers within the range of 40100 to 40199, such as RCA CD40174B becomes Motorola MC14174B.

Part number	Category	Units	Description of 4000 to 4099	Pins	Datasheet
4000	Logic gates	2	Dual 3-input NOR gate + one inverter gate	14	RCA
4001	Logic gates	4	Quad 2-input NOR gate	14	RCA, TI
4002	Logic gates	2	Dual 4-input NOR gate	14	RCA, TI
4006	Shift registers	1	18-stage shift register (four independent with common clock: two 4-stage, two 5-stage with Q4 tap)	14	RCA
4007	Analog/digital	2	Dual complementary enhanced-MOS transistor pair + 1 inverter gate	14	RCA, TI
4008	Math	1	4-bit binary full adder	16	RCA
4009	Logic gates	6	Hex inverter gate, dual power supply, can drive 1 TTL/DTL load (replaced by 4049)	16	RCA, TI
4010	Logic gates	6	Hex buffer gate, dual power supply, can drive 1 TTL/DTL load (replaced by 4050)	16	RCA, TI
4011	Logic gates	4	Quad 2-input NAND gate	14	RCA, TI
4012	Logic gates	2	Dual 4-input NAND gate	14	RCA, TI
4013	Flip-flops	2	Dual D-type flip-flop, Q & Q̅ outputs, positive-edge trigger, asynchronous set and reset	14	RCA, TI
4014	Shift registers	1	8-stage parallel in shift register (synchronous parallel load, serial in, Q6/Q7/Q8 out) (see 4021 for asynchronous)	16	RCA, TI
4015	Shift registers	2	Dual 4-stage shift register (two independent: serial in, Q1/Q2/Q3/Q4 out, reset, clock)	16	RCA, TI
4016	Analog switches	4	Quad bilateral switch	14	RCA, TI
4017	Counters	1	Decade counter (5-stage Johnson counter) with 10-output decoder, active HIGH output (see 4022 for octal)	16	RCA, TI
4018	Counters	1	Presettable divide-by-N counter	16	RCA, TI
4019	Logic gates	4	Quad AND-OR select gate	16	RCA, TI
4020	Counters	1	14-stage binary ripple counter	16	RCA, TI
4021	Shift registers	1	8-stage parallel in shift register (asynchronous parallel load, serial in, Q6/Q7/Q8 out) (see 4014 for synchronous)	16	RCA, TI
4022	Counters	1	Octal counter (4-stage Johnson counter) with 8-output decoder, active HIGH output (see 4017 for decade)	16	RCA, TI
4023	Logic gates	3	Triple 3-input NAND gate	14	RCA, TI
4024	Counters	1	7-stage binary ripple counter	14	RCA, TI
4025	Logic gates	3	Triple 3-input NOR gate	14	RCA, TI
4026	7-Segment decoders	1	Decade counter with decoded 7-segment display outputs and display enable	16	RCA, TI
4027	Flip-flops	2	Dual J-K master-slave flip-flop, Q and Q̅ outputs, positive-edge trigger, asynchronous set and reset	16	RCA, TI
4028	Multiplexers	1	4-bit BCD to 10-output decoder (can be used as 3-bit binary to 8-output decoder), active HIGH output	16	RCA, TI
4029	Counters	1	Presettable up/down counter, binary or BCD-decade	16	RCA, TI
4030	Logic gates	4	Quad XOR gate (replaced by 4070)	14	RCA, TI
4031	Shift registers	1	64-stage shift register	16	RCA, TI
4032	Math	3	Triple serial adder	16	RCA
4033	7-Segment decoders	1	Decade counter with decoded 7-segment display outputs and ripple blanking	16	RCA, TI
4034	Registers	1	8-stage bidirectional parallel/serial input/output register	24	RCA, TI
4035	Shift registers	1	4-stage parallel-in/parallel-out shift register	16	RCA, TI
4037		3	Triple AND-OR bi-phase pairs	14	RCA
4038	Math	3	Triple serial adder	16	RCA
4040	Counters	1	12-stage binary ripple counter	16	RCA, TI
4041	Logic gates	4	Quad buffer/inverter (2 outputs per gate) (4 times standard "B" drive)	14	RCA, TI
4042	Latches	4	Quad D-type latch, Q and Q̅ outputs, positive or negative edge trigger depending on polarity pin, shared clock	16	RCA, TI
4043	Latches	4	Quad NOR R-S latch, Q outputs, three-state outputs	16	RCA, TI
4044	Latches	4	Quad NAND R-S latch, Q outputs, three-state outputs	16	RCA, TI
4045	Counters	1	21-stage counter	16	RCA, TI
4046	PLL	1	Phase-locked loop with VCO	16	RCA, TI
4047	Timers	1	Monostable/astable multivibrator, external RC oscillator	14	RCA, TI
4048	Logic gates	1	Single expandable 8-input 8-function gate, three-state output, choice of: NOR, OR, NAND, AND, AND-NOR (AOI), AND-OR, OR-NAND (OAI), OR-AND	16	RCA, TI
4049	Logic gates	6	Hex inverter gate, can drive two TTL/RTL loads or four 74LS loads	16	RCA, TI
4050	Logic gates	6	Hex buffer gate, can drive two TTL/RTL loads or four 74LS loads	16	RCA, TI
4051	Analog switches	1	Single 8-channel analog multiplexer/demultiplexer	16	RCA, TI
4052	Analog switches	2	Dual 4-channel analog multiplexer/demultiplexer	16	RCA, TI
4053	Analog switches	3	Triple 2-channel analog multiplexer/demultiplexer	16	RCA, TI
4054	LCD drivers	1	4-segment LCD driver with latch	16	RCA, TI
4055	LCD drivers	1	BCD to 7-segment decoder/LCD driver with "display-frequency" output	16	RCA, TI
4056	LCD drivers	1	BCD to 7-segment decoder/LCD driver with strobed-latch function	16	RCA, TI
4057	Math	1	4-bit arithmetic logic unit (ALU)	28	RCA
4059	Counters	1	Programmable divide-by-N counter	24	RCA, TI
4060	Timers / Counters	1	14-stage binary ripple counter / timer, choice of external clock / RC oscillator / crystal oscillator (32.768 kHz compatible), 10 outputs, Schmitt-trigger inputs	16	RCA, TI
4061	Memory	1	256 × 1 bit static RAM	16	RCA
4062	Shift registers	1	200-stage dynamic shift register	16	RCA
4063	Math	1	4-bit magnitude comparator	16	RCA, TI
4066	Analog switches	4	Quad analog switch (low "ON" resistance)	14	RCA, TI
4067	Analog switches	1	Single 16-channel analog multiplexer/demultiplexer (1-of-16 switch)	24	RCA, TI
4068	Logic gates	1	Single 8-input NAND/AND gate (2 outputs per gate)	14	RCA, TI
4069	Logic gates	6	Hex inverter	14	RCA, TI
4070	Logic gates	4	Quad 2-input XOR gate	14	RCA, TI
4071	Logic gates	4	Quad 2-input OR gate	14	RCA, TI
4072	Logic gates	2	Dual 4-input OR gate	14	RCA, TI
4073	Logic gates	3	Triple 3-input AND gate	14	RCA, TI
4075	Logic gates	3	Triple 3-input OR gate	14	RCA, TI
4076	Registers	4	Quad D-type register, three-state outputs	16	RCA, TI
4077	Logic gates	4	Quad 2-input XNOR gate	14	RCA, TI
4078	Logic gates	1	Single 8-input NOR/OR gate (2 outputs per gate)	14	RCA, TI
4081	Logic gates	4	Quad 2-input AND gate	14	RCA, TI
4082	Logic gates	2	Dual 4-input AND gate	14	RCA, TI
4085	Logic gates	2	Dual 2-wide, 2-input AND-OR-invert (AOI)	14	RCA, TI
4086	Logic gates	1	Single expandable 4-wide, 2-input AND-OR-invert (AOI)	14	RCA, TI
4089	Rate multipliers	1	Binary rate multiplier	16	RCA, TI
4093	Logic gates	4	Quad 2-input NAND gate, Schmitt-trigger inputs	14	RCA, TI
4094	Shift registers	1	8-stage shift-and-store bus register	16	RCA, TI
4095	Flip-flops	1	Gated J-K flip-flop, Q and Q̅ outputs, positive-edge trigger, asynchronous set and reset, non-inverting inputs	14	RCA, TI
4096	Flip-flops	1	Gated J-K flip-flop, Q and Q̅ outputs, positive-edge trigger, asynchronous set and reset, inverting and non-inverting inputs	14	RCA, TI
4097	Analog switches	1	Single differential 8-channel analog multiplexer/demultiplexer	24	RCA, TI
4098	Timers	2	Dual one-shot monostable	16	RCA, TI
4099	Latches	1	8-bit addressable latch	16	RCA, TI
Part number	Category	Units	Description of 40100 to 40199	Pins	Datasheet
40100	Shift registers	1	32-stage left/right shift register	16	RCA
40101	Logic gates	1	9-bit parity generator	14	RCA
40102	Counters	1	Presettable 2-decade BCD down counter	16	RCA, TI
40103	Counters	1	Presettable 8-bit binary down counter	16	RCA, TI
40104	Shift registers	1	4-bit bidirectional parallel-in/parallel-out shift register, three-state outputs	16	RCA
40105	Memory	1	4-bit × 16 word FIFO register	16	RCA, TI
40106	Logic gates	6	Hex inverter gate, Schmitt-trigger inputs	14	RCA, TI
40107	Logic gates/driver	2	Dual 2-input NAND gate, 136 mA open-drain output driver (32 times standard "B" sink)	8	RCA, TI
40108	Memory	1	4 × 4-bit synchronous triple-port register file, three-state outputs	24	RCA
40109	Voltage translator	4	Quad voltage-level translator, three-state outputs, dual power rails	16	RCA, TI
40110	7-Segment decoders	1	Up/down decade counter, latch, 7-segment decoder, LED driver	16	RCA, TI
40117		2	Dual programmable 4-bit terminator	14	RCA, TI
40147		1	10-line to 4-line (BCD) priority encoder	16	RCA, TI
40160	Counters	1	4-bit synchronous decade counter, asynchronous clear, load, ripple carry output	16	RCA, TI
40161	Counters	1	4-bit synchronous binary counter, asynchronous clear, load, ripple carry output	16	RCA, TI
40162	Counters	1	4-bit synchronous decade counter, synchronous clear, load, ripple carry output	16	RCA, TI
40163	Counters	1	4-bit synchronous binary counter, synchronous clear, load, ripple carry output	16	RCA, TI
40174	Flip-flops	6	Hex D-type flip-flop, Q outputs, positive-edge trigger, shared clock and clear	16	RCA, TI
40175	Flip-flops	4	Quad D-type flip-flop, Q and Q̅ outputs, positive-edge trigger, shared clock and clear	16	RCA, TI
40181	Math	1	4-bit 16-function arithmetic logic unit (ALU)	24	RCA
40182	Math	1	Look-ahead carry generator for four adders	16	RCA
40192	Counters	1	Presettable 4-bit up/down BCD counter	16	RCA, TI
40193	Counters	1	Presettable 4-bit up/down binary counter	16	RCA, TI
40194	Shift registers	1	4-bit bidirectional parallel-in/parallel-out shift register	16	RCA, TI
Part number	Category	Units	Description of 40200 to 40299	Pins	Datasheet
40208	Memory	1	4 × 4-bit synchronous triple-port register file, three-state outputs	24	RCA
40257	Multiplexers	4	Quad 2-line to 1-line data selector/multiplexer, three-state outputs	16	RCA, TI
Part number	Category	Units	Description of 4500 to 4599	Pins	Datasheet
4500		1	Industrial control unit (ICU), 1-bit microprocessor	16	Motorola
4502	Logic gates	6	Hex strobed inverter, three-state outputs	16	RCA, TI
4503	Logic gates	6	Hex buffer, three-state outputs	16	RCA, TI
4504	Voltage translator	6	Hex voltage translator, TTL-to-CMOS or CMOS-to-CMOS, dual power rails	16	TI
4508	Latches	2	Dual 4-bit latch, Q outputs, three-state outputs	24	RCA, TI
4510	Counters	1	Presettable 4-bit BCD up/down counter	16	RCA, TI
4511	7-Segment decoders	1	BCD to 7-segment latch/decoder/LED driver	16	RCA, TI
4512	Multiplexers	1	8-input multiplexer (data selector), three-state output	16	RCA, TI
4514	Multiplexers	1	1-of-16 decoder/demultiplexer, active HIGH output	24	RCA, TI
4515	Multiplexers	1	1-of-16 decoder/demultiplexer, active LOW output	24	RCA, TI
4516	Counters	1	Presettable 4-bit binary up/down counter	16	RCA, TI
4517	Shift registers	2	Dual 64-stage shift register	16	RCA, TI
4518	Counters	2	Dual BCD up counter	16	RCA, TI
4520	Counters	2	Dual 4-bit binary up counter	16	RCA, TI
4521	Timers / Counters	1	24-stage binary ripple counter / timer, choice of external clock / RC oscillator / crystal oscillator, 7 outputs	16	TI
4522	Counters	1	Programmable BCD divide-by-N counter	16	TI
4527		1	BCD rate multiplier	16	RCA, TI
4531	Logic gates	1	13-input parity checker/generator	16	Philips
4532	Multiplexers	1	8-bit priority encoder, 3-bit output	16	RCA, TI
4536	Timers	1	Programmable timer, external clock or RC oscillator, choice of divider from 1 to 24 stages	16	RCA, TI
4538	Timers	2	Dual retriggerable precision monostable multivibrator, Q and Q̅ outputs	16	RCA, TI
4541	Timers / Counters	1	16-stage binary counter / timer, choice of external clock / RC oscillator, 1 output	14	RCA, TI
4543	LCD drivers	1	BCD to 7-segment latch/decoder/LCD driver, phase input	16	RCA, TI
4553	Counters	1	3-digit counter with latch, reset and disable, multiplexed BCD output	16	Motorola
4554	Math	1	2 bit × 2 bit parallel binary multiplier	16	Motorola
4555	Multiplexers	2	Dual 1-of-4 decoder/demultiplexer, active HIGH output	16	RCA, TI
4556	Multiplexers	2	Dual 1-of-4 decoder/demultiplexer, active LOW output	16	RCA, TI
4572	Logic gates	6	Hex gates: quad inverter gate, single 2-input NAND gate, single 2-input NOR gate	16	TI
4580	Memory	1	4 × 4-bit synchronous triple-port register file, three-state outputs	24	Motorola
4584	Logic gates	6	Hex inverter gate, Schmitt-trigger inputs	14	Onsemi
4585	Math	1	4-bit digital comparator	16	RCA, TI
Part number	Category	Units	Description of 4700 to 4799	Pins	Datasheet
4724		1	8-bit addressable latch	16	RCA, TI

== See also ==
- Electronic component
- Logic gate, Logic family
- Linear integrated circuit
- List of linear integrated circuits
- List of LM-series integrated circuits
- 4000-series integrated circuits
- 7400-series integrated circuits
- List of 7400-series integrated circuits
- Push–pull output, open drain output, Three-state output
- Schmitt trigger input
- Programmable logic device
- Pin compatibility
