= NIMPLY gate =

Digital logic gate

NIMPLY gate truth table
Input		Output
A	B	A ↛ B
0	0	0
0	1	0
1	0	1
1	1	0

The NIMPLY gate (/ˈnɪmplaɪ/, NIM-plie) is a digital logic gate that implements a material nonimplication.

== Symbols ==
A right-facing arrow with a line through it ($\nrightarrow$) can be used to denote NIMPLY in algebraic expressions. Logically, it is equivalent to material nonimplication, and the logical expression A ∧ ¬B, i.e. it outputs 0 unless A is inputting 1 and B is inputting 0. It can be thought of as "A is blocked by B."

Traditional NIMPLY Symbol	IEC symbol

== Usage ==
The NIMPLY gate is often used in synthetic biology and genetic circuits.

== See also ==
- IMPLY gate
- AND gate
- NOT gate
- NAND gate
- NOR gate
- XOR gate
- XNOR gate
- Boolean algebra (logic)
- Logic gates
