= OAI =

OAI may refer to:

- Object–action interface
- Office of American Innovation
- Omni Air International, a charter airline
- Open Archives Initiative, standards body
  - Open Archives Initiative Protocol for Metadata Harvesting
  - Open Archives Initiative Object Reuse and Exchange
- OAI, the IATA code of Bagram Airfield, Afghanistan
- OR-AND-invert, a logic gate made up of OR gates followed by a NAND gate
- Shorthand for OpenAI, an AI company

== See also ==
- Oai (disambiguation)
