= IMPLY gate =

Digital logic gate

IMPLY gate truth table
Input		Output
A	B	A → B
0	0	1
0	1	1
1	0	0
1	1	1

The IMPLY gate is a digital logic gate that implements a logical conditional.

== Symbols ==
IMPLY can be denoted in algebraic expressions with the logic symbol right-facing arrow (→). Logically, it is equivalent to material implication, and the logical expression ¬A v B.

There are two symbols for IMPLY gates: the traditional symbol and the IEEE symbol. For more information see Logic gate symbols.

Traditional IMPLY Symbol	IEEE IMPLY Symbol

== Functional completeness ==
While the Implication gate is not functionally complete by itself, it is in conjunction with the constant 0 source. This can be shown via the following:

$$\begin{align}
A \rightarrow 0 &:= \neg A \\
(A \rightarrow 0) \rightarrow B &= \neg (\neg A) \lor B \\
&= A \lor B.
\end{align}$$

Thus, since the implication gate with the addition of the constant 0 source can create both the NOT gate and the OR gate, it can create the NOR gate, which is a universal gate.

== See also ==
- NIMPLY gate
- AND gate
- NOT gate
- NAND gate
- NOR gate
- XOR gate
- XNOR gate
- Boolean algebra (logic)
- Logic gates
