= Video line selector =

Electronic device used to select between different analog video signals

Principal circuit diagram

Video line selector used for adjusting the focus: upper picture: in focus middle: bad focus lower: out of focus

Video line selector used in package checking left: picture from camera right: oscilloscope screen Red markings: horizontal: selected line vertical: timing to grab the dot of the picture

A video line selector is an electronic circuit or device for picking a line from an analog video signal. The input of the circuit is connected to an analog video source, the output triggers an oscilloscope, so display the selected line on the oscilloscope or similar device.

== Properties ==
Video line selectors are circuits or units of other devices, fitted to the demand of the unit or a separate device for use in workshops, production and laboratories. They contain analog and digital circuits and an internal or external DC power supply. There's a video signal input, sometimes an output to prevent reflexions of the video signal and the cause of shadows of the video picture, also a trigger output. There is also an input or adjust for the line number(s) to be picked out and as an option an automatic or manual setting to fit other video standards and non-interlaced video. Video line selectors do not need all the picture signal, just the synchronisation signals are needed. Sometimes inputs for H- and V-sync were installed, only.

== Setup and references ==
The video signal input is 75 Ω terminated or connected to the video output for a monitor. The amplified video signal is connected to the inputs of the H- und V-sync detector circuits. The H-sync detector outputs the horizontal synchronisation pulse filtered from the video signal. This is the line synchronisation and makes the lines fit vertically. The V-sync detector filters the vertical synchronisation and makes the picture fit the same position on the screen than the previous one.

Both synchronisation output pulses are fed to a digital synchron counter. The V-sync resets the counter. The H-sync is being counted. On every frame picture, the counter is being reset and the lines were counted. Most often interlaced video was used, spitting up a picture in the odd numbered lines, followed by the even-numbered lines in a half picture each. (→deninterlacing).

Interlace video requires a V-sync detector which detects first a second scan of the interlaced frame. Some reset the counter and toggle an interlace bit, others ignore the sync after the odd-numbered lines and continue counting. Broadcast television systems were based on a nearly identical monochrome video signal with minor changes all over the world, which a number of lines can be covered by 10 bit counter (2^{9} < lines < 2^{10} → 512 < 576 < 1024). The digital comparator, feed by the line number preset and the counter detects the logical equivalence as match of the binary numbers, which is the output pulse of the video line selector. When fed to the trigger input of an oscilloscope, the signal of the selected video line is displayed on the oscilloscope when the test probe is fed by the video signal. A precision timer can trigger a pixel or dot of the line.

In order to simplify the digital part of the circuit, it is possible to load the preset line number into the counter and have it count descending. When the counter reaches zero, the trigger output is set. A 10 inputs NOR gate is more sufficient than a 10 bits digital comparator, but evaluating several lines per picture is no longer possible. Decreasing the line number by one, the carry bit of the counter can be used as trigger output, replacing a 10 inputs NOR-Gate.

== Applications ==
Video line selecting was used in laboratory, production, and workshop: (selection only)

- focussing CCD-Sensors in cameras (all areas of the picture)
- analyzing a television signal on quality and troubleshooting video devices

Monitoring television picture content:

- decoding teletext
- was used on decoding Channel Videodat, a former television service in Germany, broadcasting software and data over television
- Restoring data like „ArVid“, using a videocassette recorder for data storage

For modifying television signals:

- teletext output to screen
- merge on-screen displays, logos or text into the television picture

As precise optical sensor:

- use a camera as optical sensor for analyzing a taken picture in automation,
- use a camera as a line sensor,
- use a camera as vertical selective line sensor.

== See also ==
- component video, HD-MAC, back porch
