= XNOR gate =

Digital logic gate

XNOR gate truth table
Input		Output
A	B	A XNOR B
0	0	1
0	1	0
1	0	0
1	1	1

The XNOR gate (sometimes ENOR, EXNOR, NXOR, XAND and pronounced as exclusive NOR) is a digital logic gate whose function is the logical complement of the exclusive OR (XOR) gate. It is equivalent to the logical connective ($\leftrightarrow$) from mathematical logic, also known as the material biconditional. The two-input version implements logical equality, behaving according to the truth table to the right, and hence the gate is sometimes called an "equivalence gate". A high output (1) results if both of the inputs to the gate are the same. If one but not both inputs are high (1), a low output (0) results.

The algebraic notation used to represent the XNOR operation is $S = A \odot B$. The algebraic expressions $(A + \overline{B}) \cdot (\overline{A} + B)$ and $A \cdot B + \overline A \cdot \overline B$ both represent the XNOR gate with inputs A and B.

== Symbols ==
There are two symbols for XNOR gates: one with distinctive shape and one with rectangular shape and label. Both symbols for the XNOR gate are that of the XOR gate with an added inversion bubble.

Distinctive symbol

Rectangular symbol

== Hardware description ==
XNOR gates are represented in most TTL and CMOS IC families. The standard 4000 series CMOS IC is the 4077, and the TTL IC is the 74266 (although an open-collector implementation). Both include four independent, two-input, XNOR gates. The (now obsolete) 74S135 implemented four two-input XOR/XNOR gates or two three-input XNOR gates.

Both the TTL 74LS implementation, the 74LS266, as well as the CMOS gates (CD4077, 74HC4077 and 74HC266 and so on) are available from most semiconductor manufacturers such as Texas Instruments or NXP, etc. They are usually available in both through-hole DIP and SOIC formats (SOIC-14, SOC-14 or TSSOP-14).

Datasheets are readily available in most datasheet databases and suppliers.

== Implementation ==
=== AND-OR-invert logic ===
An XNOR gate can be implemented using a NAND gate and an OR-AND-invert gate, as shown in the following picture. This is based on the identity

$\overline{a \veebar b} \iff \left(a \overline{\and} b\right) \overline{\and} \left(a \lor b\right)$

An alternative, which is useful when inverted inputs are also available (for example from a flip-flop), uses a 2-2 AND-OR-invert gate, shown on below on the right.

XNOR implementation using a NAND and an OAI gate

XNOR implementation using a 2-2-AOI gate with normal and inverted inputs

=== CMOS ===
CMOS implementations based on the OAI logic above can be realized with 10 transistors, as shown below. The implementation which uses both normal and inverted inputs uses 8 transistors, or 12 if inverters have to be used.

An XNOR-gate in CMOS using a NAND and an OR-AND-invert gate

An XNOR gate in CMOS using both normal and inverted inputs

Pinout diagram of the 74HC266N, 74LS266 and CD4077 quad XNOR plastic dual in-line package 14-pin package (PDIP-14) ICs.

== Alternatives ==
XNOR gate circuit using three mixed gates

If a specific type of gate is not available, a circuit that implements the same function can be constructed from other available gates. A circuit implementing an XNOR function can be trivially constructed from an XOR gate followed by a NOT gate. If we consider the expression $(A + \overline{B}) \cdot (\overline{A} + B)$, we can construct an XNOR gate circuit directly using AND, OR and NOT gates. However, this approach requires five gates of three different kinds.

As alternative, if different gates are available we can apply Boolean algebra to transform $(A + \overline{B}) \cdot (\overline{A} + B) \equiv (A \cdot B) + ( \overline A \cdot \overline B )$ as stated above, and apply de Morgan's Law to the last term to get $(A \cdot B) + \overline {(A + B)}$ which can be implemented using only three gates as shown on the right.

An XNOR gate circuit can be made from four NOR gates. In fact, both NAND and NOR gates are so-called "universal gates" and any logical function can be constructed from either NAND logic or NOR logic alone. If the four NOR gates are replaced by NAND gates, this results in an XOR gate, which can be converted to an XNOR gate by inverting the output or one of the inputs (e.g. with a fifth NAND gate).

Desired gate	NAND construction	NOR construction

An alternative arrangement is of five NAND gates in a topology that emphasizes the construction of the function from $(A \cdot B) + (\overline{A} \cdot \overline{B})$, noting from de Morgan's Law that a NAND gate is an inverted-input OR gate. Another alternative arrangement is of five NOR gates in a topology that emphasizes the construction of the function from $(A + \overline{B}) \cdot (\overline{A} + B)$, noting from de Morgan's Law that a NOR gate is an inverted-input AND gate.

Desired gate	NAND construction	NOR construction

For the NAND constructions, the lower arrangement offers the advantage of a shorter propagation delay (the time delay between an input changing and the output changing). For the NOR constructions, the upper arrangement requires fewer gates.

From the opposite perspective, constructing other gates using only XNOR gates is possible though XNOR is not a fully universal logic gate. NOT and XOR gates can be constructed this way.

== More than two inputs ==
Although other gates (OR, NOR, AND, NAND) are available from manufacturers with three or more inputs per gate, this is not strictly true with XOR and XNOR gates. However, extending the concept of the binary logical operation to three inputs, the SN74S135 with two shared "C" and four independent "A" and "B" inputs for its four outputs, was a device that followed the truth table:

Input			Output
A	B	C	Q
0	0	0	1
0	0	1	0
0	1	0	0
0	1	1	1
1	0	0	0
1	0	1	1
1	1	0	1
1	1	1	0

This is effectively Q = NOT ((A XOR B) XOR C). Another way to interpret this is that the output is true if an even number of inputs are true. It does not implement a logical "equivalence" function, unlike two-input XNOR gates.

== See also ==
- AND gate
- OR gate
- NOT gate
- NAND gate
- NOR gate
- XOR gate
- Kronecker delta function
- Logical biconditional
- If and only if
