= IC power-supply pin =

Power supply connections for integrated circuits

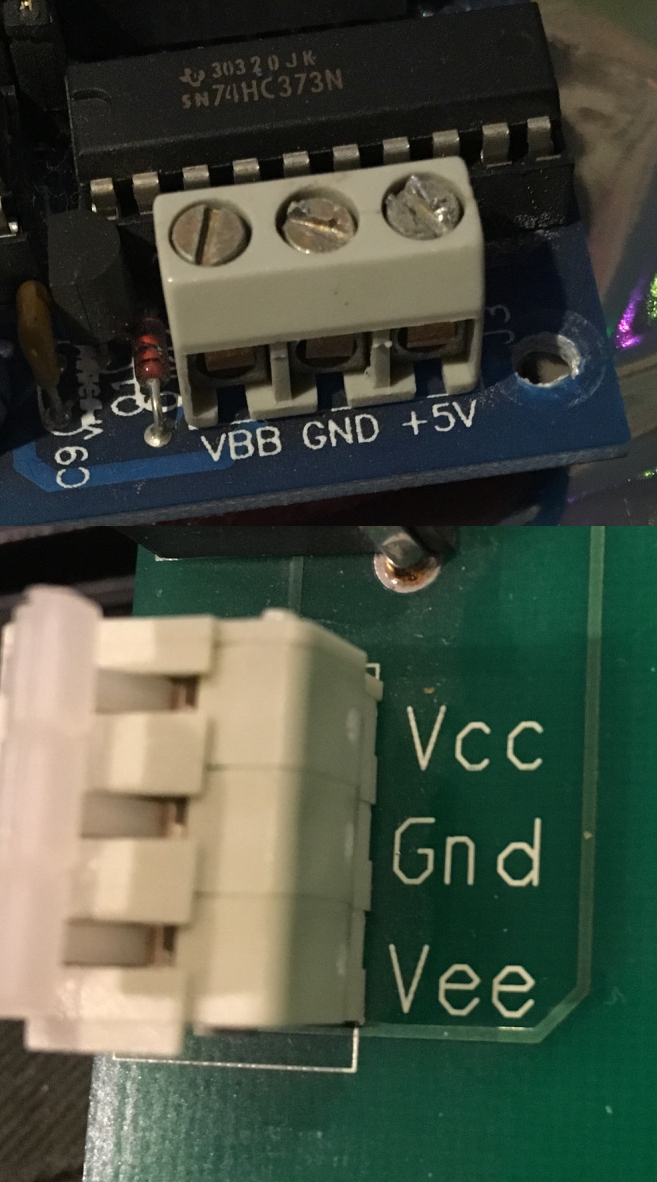
Power-supply inputs on circuit boards with screen-printed voltage subscripts

IC power-supply pins are voltage and current supply terminals found on integrated circuits (ICs) in electrical engineering, electronic engineering, and integrated circuit design. (Note: Regarding "voltage and current".) ICs have at least two pins that connect to the power rails of the circuit in which they are installed. These are known as the power-supply pins. However, the labeling of the pins varies by IC family and manufacturer. The double-subscript notation usually corresponds to a first letter in a given IC family (transistors) notation of the terminals (e.g. V_{DD} supply for a drain terminal in FETs etc.).

Typical supply-pin labeling
	NPN BJT (Note: Used by convention.)	N-FET			AC/DC (Note: Meaning the power sourced from PSU toward power converter, like buck converter etc.)	DC	DC
Positive supply voltage	V_{CC}/V_{BB}	V_{DD}	V+	V_{S+}	VIN	VDD	VA
Negative supply voltage	V_{EE}	V_{SS}	V−	V_{S−}			
Ground	GND	GND	0	0	GND	GND	GND

The simplest labels are V+ and V−, but internal design and historical traditions have led to a variety of other labels being used. V+ and V− may also refer to the non-inverting (+) and inverting (−) voltage inputs of ICs like op amps.

For power supplies, sometimes one of the supply rails is referred to as ground (abbreviated "GND") – positive and negative voltages are relative to the ground. In digital electronics, negative voltages are seldom present, and the ground nearly always is the lowest voltage level. In analog electronics (e.g. an audio power amplifier) the ground can be a voltage level between the most positive and most negative voltage level.

While double-subscript notation, where subscripted letters denote the difference between two points, uses similar-looking placeholders with subscripts, the double-letter supply voltage subscript notation is not directly linked (though it may have been an influencing factor).

== BJTs ==
ICs using bipolar junction transistors have V_{CC} (+, positive) and V_{EE} (-, negative) power-supply pins – though V_{CC} is also often used for CMOS devices as well.

In circuit diagrams and circuit analysis, there are long-standing conventions regarding the naming of voltages, currents, and some components. In the analysis of a bipolar junction transistor, for example, in a common-emitter configuration, the DC voltage at the collector, emitter, and base (with respect to ground) may be written as V_{C}, V_{E}, and V_{B} respectively.

Resistors associated with these transistor terminals may be designated R_{C}, R_{E}, and R_{B}. In order to create the DC voltages, the furthest voltage, beyond these resistors or other components if present, was often referred to as V_{CC}, V_{EE}, and V_{BB}. In practice V_{CC} and V_{EE} then refer to the positive and negative supply lines respectively in common NPN circuits. Note that V_{CC} would be negative, and V_{EE} would be positive in equivalent PNP circuits.

The V_{BB} specifies reference bias supply voltage in ECL logic. (Note: This is specifically used in TTL emitter-coupled logic (ECL) devices . The definition itself is taken from a book by Motorola on Military ECL (MECL).)

== FETs ==
Exactly analogous conventions were applied to field-effect transistors with their drain, source and gate terminals. This led to V_{D} and V_{S} being created by supply voltages designated V_{DD} and V_{SS} in the more common circuit configurations. In equivalence to the difference between NPN and PNP bipolars, V_{DD} is positive with regard to V_{SS} in the case of n-channel FETs and MOSFETs and negative for circuits based on p-channel FETs and MOSFETs.

=== CMOS ===
CMOS ICs have generally borrowed the NMOS convention of V_{DD} for positive and V_{SS} for negative, even though both positive and negative supply rails connect to source terminals (the positive supply goes to PMOS sources, the negative supply to NMOS sources).

In many single-supply digital and analog circuits the negative power supply is also called "GND". In "split-rail" supply systems there are multiple supply voltages. Examples of such systems include modern cell phones, with GND and voltages such as 1.2 V, 1.8 V, 2.4 V, 3.3 V, and PCs, with GND and voltages such as −5 V, 3.3 V, 5 V, 12 V. Power-sensitive designs often have multiple power rails at a given voltage, using them to conserve energy by switching off supplies to components that are not in active use.

More advanced circuits often have pins carrying voltage levels for more specialized functions, and these are generally labeled with some abbreviation of their purpose. For example, V_{USB} for the supply delivered to a USB device (nominally 5 V), V_{BAT} for a battery, or V_{ref} for the reference voltage for an analog-to-digital converter. Systems combining both digital and analog circuits often distinguish digital and analog grounds (GND and AGND), helping isolate digital noise from sensitive analog circuits. High-security cryptographic devices and other secure systems sometimes require separate power supplies for their unencrypted and encrypted (red/black) subsystems to prevent leakage of sensitive plaintext.

== BJTs and FETs mixed ==
Although still in relatively common use, there is limited relevance of these device-specific power-supply designations in circuits that use a mixture of bipolar and FET elements, or in those that employ either both NPN and PNP transistors or both n- and p-channel FETs. This latter case is very common in modern chips, which are often based on CMOS technology, where the C stands for complementary, meaning that complementary pairs of n- and p-channel devices are common throughout.

These naming conventions were part of a bigger picture, where, to continue with bipolar-transistor examples, although the FET remains entirely analogous, DC or bias currents into or out of each terminal may be written I_{C}, I_{E}, and I_{B}. Apart from DC or bias conditions, many transistor circuits also process a smaller audio-, video-, or radio-frequency signal that is superimposed on the bias at the terminals. Lower-case letters and subscripts are used to refer to these signal levels at the terminals, either peak-to-peak or RMS as required. So we see v_{c}, v_{e}, and v_{b}, as well as i_{c}, i_{e}, and i_{b}. Using these conventions, in a common-emitter amplifier, the ratio v_{c}/v_{b} represents the small-signal voltage gain at the transistor, and v_{c}/i_{b} the small-signal trans-resistance, from which the name transistor is derived by contraction. In this convention, v_{i} and v_{o} usually refer to the external input and output voltages of the circuit or stage.

Similar conventions were applied to circuits involving vacuum tubes, or thermionic valves, as they were known outside of the U.S. Therefore, we see V_{P}, V_{K}, and V_{G} referring to plate (or anode outside of the U.S.), cathode (note K, not C) and grid voltages in analyses of vacuum triode, tetrode, and pentode circuits.

== See also ==
- 4000 series
- 7400 series
- Bob Widlar
- Common collector
- Differential amplifier
- Letter and numeral code for voltages
- List of 4000 series integrated circuits
- List of 7400 series integrated circuits
- Logic family
- Logic gate
- Open collector
- Operational amplifier applications
- Pin-compatibility
- Reference designator
