= Oai =

Oai may refer to:

- Oai (Attica), a deme of ancient Attica (Area surrounding Ancient Greece)
- Saigō-no-Tsubone (1552–1589), a figure in the history of feudal Japan whose common nickname was Oai

== See also ==
- OAI (disambiguation)
