= Double subscript notation =

Type of notation used in engineering documentation

In engineering, double-subscript notation is a notation used to indicate some variable between two points (each point being represented by one of the subscripts). In electronics, the notation is usually used to indicate the direction of current or voltage, while in mechanical engineering it is sometimes used to describe the force or stress between two points, and sometimes even a component that spans between two points (like a beam on a bridge or truss). Although there are many cases where multiple subscripts are used, they are not necessarily called double subscript notation specifically.

== Electronic usage ==
IEEE standard 255-1963, "Letter Symbols for Semiconductor Devices", defined eleven original quantity symbols expressed as abbreviations.

| Symbol | Quality |
|---|---|
| A | Anode |
| AV | Average |
| B | Base |
| C | Collector |
| E | Emitter |
| G | Gate |
| J | Semiconductor terminal |
| K | Cathode |
| M | Maximum |
| Min | Minimum |
| X | Node (of a circuit) |

This is the basis for a convention to standardize the directions of double-subscript labels. The following uses transistors as an example, but shows how the direction is read generally. The convention works like this:

$V_\mathrm{CB} \$ represents the voltage from C to B. In this case, C would denote the collector end of a transistor, and B would denote the base end of the same transistor. This is the same as saying "the voltage drop from C to B", though this applies the standard definitions of the letters C and B. This convention is consistent with IEC 60050-121.

$I_\mathrm{CE} \$ would in turn represent the current from C to E. In this case, C would again denote the collector end of a transistor, and E would denote the emitter end of the transistor. This is the same as saying "the current in the direction going from C to E".

Power supply pins on integrated circuits utilize the same letters for denoting what kind of voltage the pin would receive. For example, a power input labeled V_{CC} would be a positive input that would presumably connect to the collector pin of a BJT transistor in the circuit, and likewise respectively with other subscripted letters. The format used is the same as for notations described above, though without the connotation of V_{CC} meaning the voltage from a collector pin to collector pin; the repetition avoids confusion as such an expression would not exist.

The table above shows only the originally denoted letters; others have found their way into use over time, such as S and D for the Source and Drain of a FET, respectively.
