= Digital comparator =

Digital electronic component which compares two binary numbers

A digital comparator or magnitude comparator is a hardware electronic device that takes two numbers as input in binary form and determines whether one number is greater than, less than or equal to the other number. Comparators are used in central processing units (CPUs) and microcontrollers (MCUs). Examples of digital comparator include the CMOS 4063 and 4585 and the TTL 7485 and 74682.

An XNOR gate is a basic comparator, because its output is "1" only if its two input bits are equal.

The analog equivalent of digital comparator is the voltage comparator. Many microcontrollers have analog comparators on some of their inputs that can be read or trigger an interrupt.

== Implementation ==
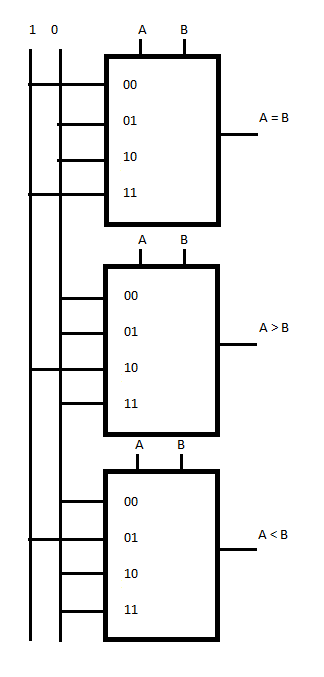
Digital comparator using multiplexers

Consider two 4-bit binary numbers A and B so

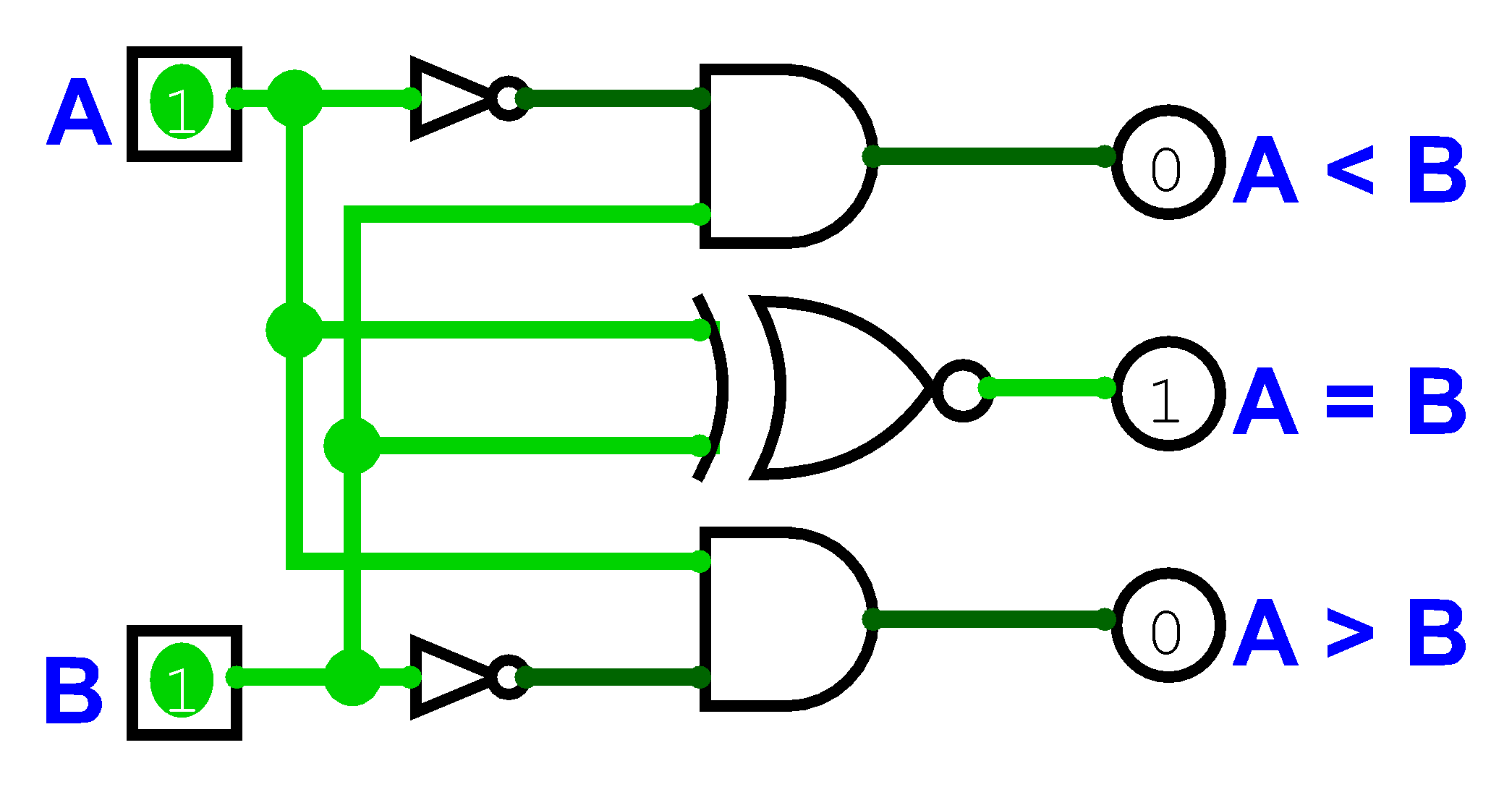
One-bit binary comparator, with outputs for equality, greater than, and less than.

$A=A_3A_2A_1A_0$

$B=B_3B_2B_1B_0$

Here each subscript represents one of the digits in the numbers.

Equality

The binary numbers A and B will be equal if all the pairs of significant digits of both numbers are equal, i.e.,

$A_3=B_3$, $A_2=B_2$, $A_1=B_1$ and $A_0=B_0$

Since the numbers are binary, the digits are either 0 or 1 and the boolean function for equality of any two digits $A_i$ and $B_i$ can be expressed as

$x_i= A_i \cdot B_i + \overline{A_i} \cdot \overline{B_i}$ we can also replace it by XNOR gate in digital electronics.

$x_i$ is 1 only if $A_i$ and $B_i$ are equal.

For the equality of A and B, all $x_i$ variables (for i=0,1,2,3) must be 1.

So the equality condition of A and B can be implemented using the AND operation as

$(A=B) = x_3 \cdot x_2 \cdot x_1 \cdot x_0$

The binary variable (A=B) is 1 only if all pairs of digits of the two numbers are equal.

Inequality

In order to manually determine the greater of two binary numbers, we inspect the relative magnitudes of pairs of significant digits, starting from the most significant bit, gradually proceeding towards lower significant bits until an inequality is found. When an inequality is found, if the corresponding bit of A is 1 and that of B is 0 then we conclude that A>B.

This sequential comparison can be expressed logically as:

$(A>B)=A_3 \cdot \overline{B_3} + x_3 \cdot A_2 \cdot \overline{B_2} + x_3 \cdot x_2 \cdot A_1 \cdot \overline{B_1} + x_3 \cdot x_2 \cdot x_1 \cdot A_0 \cdot \overline{B_0}$

$(A<B)=\overline{A_3} \cdot B_3 + x_3 \cdot \overline{A_2} \cdot B_2 + x_3 \cdot x_2 \cdot \overline{A_1} \cdot B_1 + x_3 \cdot x_2 \cdot x_1 \cdot \overline{A_0} \cdot B_0$

(A > B) and (A < B) are output binary variables, which are equal to 1 when A > B or A < B respectively.

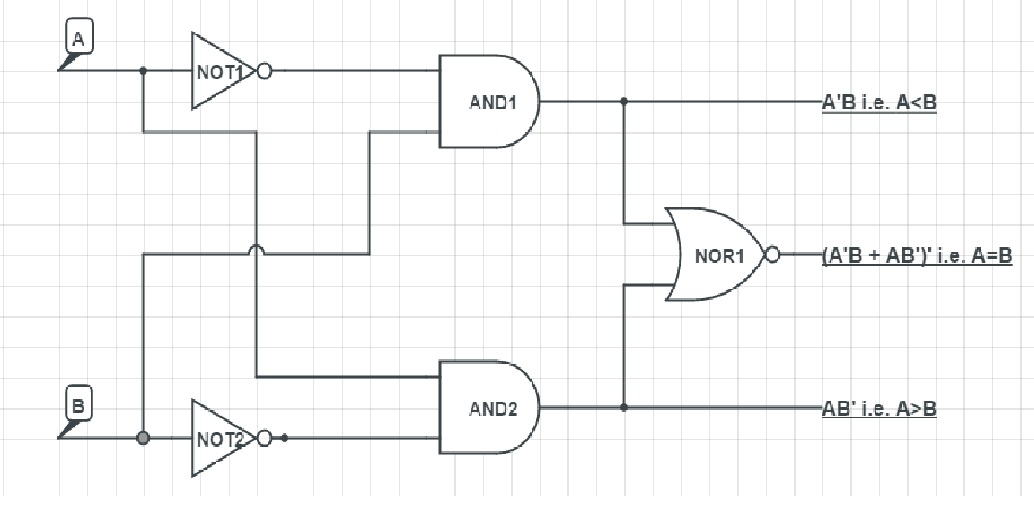
alternative comparator without using XNOR (using NOR gate)

== See also ==
- List of LM-series integrated circuits
- 4000 series, List of 4000 series integrated circuits
- 7400 series, List of 7400 series integrated circuits
- Sorting network
