= OR-AND-invert =

OR-AND-invert gates, or OAI-gates, are logic gates comprising OR gates followed by a NAND gate. They can be efficiently implemented in logic families like CMOS and TTL. They are dual to AND-OR-invert gates.

== Overview ==
OR-AND-invert gates implement the inverted product of sums. $n$ groups of $m_i$, $m_i \ge 1, i=1\ldots n$ input signals combined with OR, and the results then combined with NAND.

== Examples ==
=== 2-1 OAI-gate ===
Symbol for an 2-1 OAI-gate. The OR gate has the inputs A and B.

A 2-1-OAI gate realizes the following function:

$$Y = \overline{(A \lor B) \land C}$$

Truth table 2-1 OAI
Input; A B C			Output; Y
0	0	0	1
0	0	1	1
0	1	0	1
0	1	1	0
1	0	0	1
1	0	1	0
1	1	0	1
1	1	1	0

=== 2-2 OAI gate ===
A 2-2-OAI gate realizes the following function:

$$Y = \overline{(A \lor B) \land (C \lor D)}$$

Truth table 2-2 OAI
INPUT; A B C D				OUTPUT; Q
0	0	0	0	1
0	0	0	1	1
0	0	1	0	1
0	0	1	1	1
0	1	0	0	1
0	1	0	1	0
0	1	1	0	0
0	1	1	1	0
1	0	0	0	1
1	0	0	1	0
1	0	1	0	0
1	0	1	1	0
1	1	0	0	1
1	1	0	1	0
1	1	1	0	0
1	1	1	1	0

== Realization ==
Implementation of a 3-1 OAI-gate in CMOS

OAI-gates can efficiently be implemented as complex gates. An example of a 3-1 OAI-gate is shown in the figure below.

== Examples of use ==
One possibility of implementing an XOR gate is by using a 2-2-OAI-gate with non-inverted and inverted inputs.

Implementation of an XOR gate using a 2-2-OAI gate
