= List of 7400-series integrated circuits =

The following is a list of 7400-series digital logic integrated circuits. In the mid-1960s, the original 7400-series integrated circuits were introduced by Texas Instruments with the prefix "SN" to create the name SN74xx. Due to the popularity of these parts, other manufacturers released pin-to-pin compatible logic devices and kept the 7400 sequence number as an aid to identification of compatible parts. However, other manufacturers use different prefixes and suffixes on their part numbers.

== Overview ==
Some TTL logic parts were made with an extended military-specification temperature range. These parts are prefixed with 54 instead of 74 in the part number.

A short-lived 64 prefix on Texas Instruments parts indicated an industrial temperature range; this prefix had been dropped from the TI literature by 1973. Most recent 7400-series parts are fabricated in CMOS or BiCMOS technology rather than TTL. Surface-mount parts with a single gate (often in a 5-pin or 6-pin package) are prefixed with 741G instead of 74.

Some manufacturers released some 4000-series equivalent CMOS circuits with a 74 prefix, for example, the 74HC4066 was a replacement for the 4066 with slightly different electrical characteristics (different power-supply voltage ratings, higher frequency capabilities, lower "on" resistances in analog switches, etc.). See List of 4000-series integrated circuits. Conversely, the 4000-series has "borrowed" from the 7400 series – such as the CD40193 and CD40161 being pin-for-pin functional replacements for 74C193 and 74C161.

Older TTL parts made by manufacturers such as Signetics, Motorola, Mullard and Siemens may have different numeric prefix and numbering series entirely, such as in the European FJ family FJH101 is an 8-input NAND gate like a 7430.

A few alphabetic characters to designate a specific logic subfamily may immediately follow the 74 or 54 in the part number, e.g., 74LS74 for low-power Schottky. Some CMOS parts such as 74HCT74 for high-speed CMOS with TTL-compatible input thresholds are functionally similar to the TTL part. Not all functions are available in all families. The generic descriptive feature of these alphabetic characters was diluted by various companies participating in the market at its peak and are not always consistent especially with more recent offerings. The National Semiconductor trademarks of the words FAST and FACT are usually cited in the descriptions from other companies when describing their own unique designations.

In a few instances, such as the 7478 and 74107, the same suffix in different families do not have completely equivalent logic functions.

Another extension to the series is the 7416xxx variant, representing mostly the 16-bit-wide counterpart of otherwise 8-bit-wide "base" chips with the same three ending digits. Thus e.g. a "7416373" would be the 16-bit-wide equivalent of a "74373". Some 7416xxx parts, however, do not have a direct counterpart from the standard 74xxx range but deliver new functionality instead, which needs making use of the 7416xxx series' higher pin count. For more details, refer primarily to the Texas Instruments documentation mentioned in the References section.

For CMOS (AC, HC, etc.) subfamilies, read "open drain" for "open collector" in the table below.

There are a few numeric suffixes that have multiple conflicting assignments, such as the 74453.

== Logic gates ==
Schematic of 74LS51 IC consists of a 3-3 AOI gate and 2-2 AOI gate. AOI means AND-OR-Invert (AND-NOR). Most AOI chips are currently obsolete.

74LS51 pinout diagram

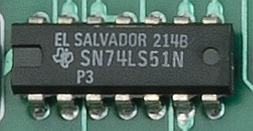
TI SN74LS51 in DIP-14 package

Since there are numerous 7400-series parts, the following groups related parts to make it easier to pick a useful part number. This section only includes combinational logic gates.

For part numbers in this section, "x" is the 7400-series logic family, such as LS, ALS, HCT, AHCT, HC, AHC, LVC, ...

Normal inputs / push–pull outputs

Configuration	Buffer	Inverter
Hex 1-input	74x34	74x04

Configuration	AND	NAND	OR	NOR	XOR	XNOR
Quad 2-input	74x08	74x00	74x32	74x02	74x86	74x7266
Triple 3-Input	74x11	74x10	74x4075	74x27	n/a	n/a
Dual 4-input	74x21	74x20	74x4072	74x29	n/a	n/a
Single 8-input	n/a	74x30	74x4078	74x4078	n/a	n/a

Schmitt-trigger inputs / push–pull outputs

Configuration	Buffer	Inverter
Hex 1-input	74x7014	74x14

Configuration	AND	NAND	OR	NOR
Quad 2-input	74x7001	74x132	74x7032	74x7002
Dual 4-input	n/a	74x13	n/a	n/a

Normal inputs / open-collector outputs

Configuration	Buffer	Inverter
Hex 1-input	74x07	74x05

Configuration	AND	NAND	OR	NOR	XOR	XNOR
Quad 2-input	74x09	74x03	n/a	74x33	74x136	74x266
Triple 3-input	74x15	74x12	n/a	n/a	n/a	n/a
Dual 4-input	n/a	74x22	n/a	n/a	n/a	n/a

Schmitt-trigger inputs / three-state outputs

Configuration	Buffer	Inverter
Octal 1-input	74x241 74x244	74x240

AND-OR-invert (AOI) logic gates
NOTE: in past decades, a number of AND-OR-invert (AOI) parts were available in 7400 TTL families, but currently most are obsolete.

- SN5450 = dual 2-2 AOI gate, one is expandable (SN54 is military version of SN74)
- SN74LS51 = 2-2 AOI gate and 3-3 AOI gate
- SN54LS54 = single 2-3-3-2 AOI gate

== Larger footprints ==
Parts in this section have a pin count of 14 pins or more. The lower part numbers were established in the 1960s and 1970s, then higher part numbers were added incrementally over decades. IC manufacturers continue to make a core subset of this group, but many of these part numbers are considered obsolete and no longer manufactured. Older discontinued parts may be available from a limited number of sellers as new old stock (NOS), though some are much harder to find.

For the following table:

- Part number column – the "x" is a place holder for the logic subfamily name. For example, 74x00 in "LS" logic family would be "74LS00".
- Description column – simplified to make it easier to sort, thus isn't identical to datasheet title. The terms Schmitt trigger, open-collector/open-drain, three-state were moved to the input and output columns to make it easier to sort by those features.
- Input column – a blank cell means a normal input for the logic family type.
- Output column – a blank cell means a "totem pole" output, also known as a push–pull output, with the ability to drive ten standard inputs of the same logic subfamily (fan-out N_{O} = 10). Outputs with higher output currents are often called drivers or buffers.
- Pins column – number of pins for the dual in-line package (DIP) version; a number in parentheses (round brackets) indicates that there is no known dual in-line package version of this IC.

=== 74x00 – 74x99 === Part number	Units	Description	Input	Output	Pins	Datasheet
74x00	4	quad 2-input NAND gate			14	SN74LS00
74x01	4	quad 2-input NAND gate; different pinout for 74H01		open-collector	14	SN74LS01
74x02	4	quad 2-input NOR gate			14	SN74LS02
74x03	4	quad 2-input NAND gate		open-collector	14	SN74LS03
74x04	6	hex inverter gate			14	SN74LS04
74x05	6	hex inverter gate		open-collector	14	SN74LS05
74x06	6	hex inverter gate		open-collector 30 V / 40 mA	14	SN74LS06
74x07	6	hex buffer gate		open-collector 30 V / 40 mA	14	SN74LS07
74x08	4	quad 2-input AND gate			14	SN74LS08
74x09	4	quad 2-input AND gate		open-collector	14	SN74LS09
74x10	3	triple 3-input NAND gate			14	SN74LS10
74x11	3	triple 3-input AND gate			14	SN74LS11
74x12	3	triple 3-input NAND gate		open-collector	14	SN74LS12
74x13	2	dual 4-input NAND gate	Schmitt trigger		14	SN74LS13
74x14	6	hex inverter gate	Schmitt trigger		14	SN74LS14
74x15	3	triple 3-input AND gate		open-collector	14	SN74LS15
74x16	6	hex inverter gate		open-collector 15 V / 40 mA	14	SN7416
74x17	6	hex buffer gate		open-collector 15 V / 40 mA	14	SN7417
74x18	2	dual 4-input NAND gate	Schmitt trigger		14	SN74LS18
74x19	6	hex inverter gate	Schmitt trigger		14	SN74LS19
74x20	2	dual 4-input NAND gate			14	SN74LS20
74x21	2	dual 4-input AND gate			14	SN74LS21
74x22	2	dual 4-input NAND gate		open-collector	14	SN74LS22
74x23	2	dual 4-input NOR gate with strobe, one gate expandable with 74x60			16	SN7423
74x24	4	quad 2-input NAND gate	Schmitt trigger		14	SN74LS24
74x25	2	dual 4-input NOR gate with strobe			14	SN7425
74x26	4	quad 2-input NAND gate		open-collector 15 V	14	SN74LS26
74x27	3	triple 3-input NOR gate			14	SN74LS27
74x28	4	quad 2-input NOR gate		driver N_{O}=30	14	SN74LS28
74x29	2	dual 4-input NOR gate			14	US7429A
74x30	1	single 8-input NAND gate			14	SN74LS30
74x31	6	hex delay elements (two 6ns, two 23-32ns, two 45-48ns)			16	SN74LS31
74x32	4	quad 2-input OR gate			14	SN74LS32
74x33	4	quad 2-input NOR gate		open-collector driver N_{O}=30	14	SN74LS33
74x34	6	hex buffer gate			14	MM74HC34
74x35	6	hex buffer gate		open-collector	14	SN74ALS35
74x36	4	quad 2-input NOR gate (different pinout than 7402)			14	SN74HC36
74x37	4	quad 2-input NAND gate		driver N_{O}=30	14	SN74LS37
74x38	4	quad 2-input NAND gate		open-collector driver N_{O}=30	14	SN74LS38
74x39	4	quad 2-input NAND gate (different pinout than 7438)		open-collector 60 mA	14	SN7439
74x40	2	dual 4-input NAND gate		driver N_{O}=30	14	SN74LS40
74x41	1	BCD to decimal decoder / Nixie tube driver		open-collector 70 V	16	DM7441A
74x42	1	BCD to decimal decoder			16	SN74LS42
74x43	1	excess-3 to decimal decoder			16	SN7443A
74x44	1	Gray code to decimal decoder			16	SN7444A
74x45	1	BCD to decimal decoder/driver		open-collector 30 V / 80 mA	16	SN7445
74x46	1	BCD to 7-segment display decoder/driver		open-collector 30 V	16	SN7446A
74x47	1	BCD to 7-segment decoder/driver		open-collector 15 V	16	SN74LS47
74x48	1	BCD to 7-segment decoder/driver		open-collector, 2 kΩ pull-up	16	SN74LS48
74x49	1	BCD to 7-segment decoder/driver		open-collector	14	SN74LS49
74x50	2	dual 2-2-input AND-OR-Invert gate, one gate expandable			14	SN7450
7451, 74H51, 74S51	2	dual 2-2-input AND-OR-Invert (AOI) gate			14	SN7451
74L51, 74LS51	2	3-3-input AND-OR-Invert gate and 2-2-input AND-OR-Invert gate			14	SN74LS51
74x52	1	3-2-2-2-input AND-OR gate, expandable with 74x61			14	SN74H52
7453	1	2-2-2-2-input AND-OR-Invert gate, expandable			14	SN7453
74H53	1	3-2-2-2-input AND-OR-Invert gate, expandable			14	SN74H53
7454	1	2-2-2-2-input AND-OR-Invert gate			14	SN7454
74H54	1	3-2-2-2-input AND-OR-Invert gate			14	SN74H54
74L54, 74LS54	1	3-3-2-2-input AND-OR-Invert gate			14	SN74LS54
74x55	1	4-4-input AND-OR-Invert gate, 74H55 is expandable			14	SN74LS55
74x56	1	50:1 frequency divider			8	SN74LS56
74x57	1	60:1 frequency divider			8	SN74LS57
74x58	2	3-3-input AND-OR gate and 2-2-input AND-OR gate			14	74HC58
74x59	2	dual 3-2-input AND-OR-Invert gate			14	US7459A
74x60	2	dual 4-input expander for 74x23, 74x50, 74x53, 74x55			14	SN7460
74x61	3	triple 3-input expander for 74x52			14	SN74H61
74x62	1	3-3-2-2-input AND-OR expander for 74x50, 74x53, 74x55			14	SN74H62
74x63	6	hex current sensing interface gates			14	SN74LS63
74x64	1	4-3-2-2-input AND-OR-Invert gate			14	SN74S64
74x65	1	4-3-2-2 input AND-OR-Invert gate		open-collector	14	SN74S65
74x67	1	AND gated J-K master-slave flip-flop, asynchronous preset and clear (improved 74L72)			(16)	BL54L67Y
74L68	2	dual J-K flip-flop, asynchronous clear (improved 74L73)			(18)	BL54L68Y
74LS68	2	dual 4-bit decade counters			16	SN74LS68
74L69	2	dual J-K flip-flop, asynchronous preset, shared clock and clear			(18)	BL54L69Y
74LS69	2	dual 4-bit binary counters			16	SN74LS69
74x70	1	AND-gated positive-edge-triggered J-K flip-flop, asynchronous preset and clear			14	SN7470
74H71	1	AND-OR-gated J-K master-slave flip-flop, preset			14	SN74H71
74L71	1	AND-gated R-S master-slave flip-flop, preset and clear			14	SN54L71
74x72	1	AND gated J-K master-slave flip-flop, asynchronous preset and clear			14	SN7472
74x73	2	dual J-K flip-flop, asynchronous clear			14	SN54LS73A
74x74	2	dual D positive-edge-triggered flip-flop, asynchronous clear & preset, Q & /Q outputs			14	SN74LS74A
74x75	1	4-bit bistable latch, complementary outputs			16	SN74LS75
74x76	2	dual J-K flip-flop, asynchronous preset and clear			16	SN74LS76A
74x77	1	4-bit bistable latch			14	SN54LS77
74H78	2	dual positive-pulse-triggered J-K flip-flop, preset, shared clock and clear			14	SN74H78
74L78	2	dual positive-pulse-triggered J-K flip-flop, preset, shared clock and clear			14	SN54L78
74LS78	2	dual negative-edge-triggered J-K flip-flop, preset, shared clock and clear			14	SN74LS78A
74x79	2	dual D positive-edge-triggered flip-flop, asynchronous preset and clear			14	MC7479
74x80	1	gated full adder			14	SN7480
74x81	1	16-bit RAM			14	SN7481A
74x82	1	2-bit binary full adder			14	SN7482
74x83	1	4-bit binary full adder			16	SN74LS83A
74x84	1	16-bit RAM			16	SN7484A
74x85	1	4-bit magnitude comparator			16	SN74LS85
74x86	4	quad 2-input XOR gate			14	SN74LS86A
74x87	1	4-bit true/complement/zero/one element			14	SN74H87
74x88	1	256-bit ROM (32x8)		open-collector	16	SN7488A
74x89	1	64-bit RAM (16x4), 4 data inputs, 4 inverted data outputs		open-collector	16	SN7489
74x90	1	decade counter (separate divide-by-2 and divide-by-5 sections)			14	SN74LS90
74x91	1	8-bit shift register, serial in, serial out, gated input			14	SN74LS91
74x92	1	divide-by-12 counter (separate divide-by-2 and divide-by-6 sections)			14	SN74LS92
74x93	1	4-bit binary counter (separate divide-by-2 and divide-by-8 sections); different pinout for 74L93			14	SN74LS93
74x94	1	4-bit shift register, dual asynchronous presets			16	SN7494
74x95	1	4-bit shift register, parallel in, parallel out, serial input; different pinout for 74L95			14	SN74LS95B
74x96	1	5-bit parallel-in/parallel-out shift register, asynchronous preset			16	SN74LS96
74x97	1	synchronous 6-bit binary rate multiplier			16	SN7497
74x98	1	4-bit data selector/storage register			16	SN54L98
74x99	1	4-bit bidirectional universal shift register			16	SN54L99
=== 74x100 – 74x199 === Part number	Units	Description	Input	Output	Pins	Datasheet
74x100	2	dual 4-bit bistable latch			24	SN74100
74x101	1	AND-OR-gated J-K negative-edge-triggered flip-flop, preset			14	SN74H101
74x102	1	AND-gated J-K negative-edge-triggered flip-flop, preset and clear			14	SN74H102
74x103	2	dual J-K negative-edge-triggered flip-flop, clear			14	SN74H103
74x104	1	J-K master-slave flip-flop			14	SN74104
74x105	1	J-K master-slave flip-flop, J2 and K2 inverted			14	SN74105
74x106	2	dual J-K negative-edge-triggered flip-flop, preset and clear			16	SN74H106
74x107	2	dual J-K flip-flop, clear			14	SN74LS107A
74x108	2	dual J-K negative-edge-triggered flip-flop, preset, shared clock and clear			14	SN74H108
74x109	2	dual J-NotK positive-edge-triggered flip-flop, clear and preset			16	SN74LS109A
74x110	1	AND-gated J-K master-slave flip-flop, data lockout			14	SN74110
74x111	2	dual J-K master-slave flip-flop, data lockout, reset, set			16	SN74111
74x112	2	dual J-K negative-edge-triggered flip-flop, clear & preset, Q & /Q outputs			16	SN74LS112A
74x113	2	dual J-K negative-edge-triggered flip-flop, preset			14	SN74LS113A
74x114	2	dual J-K negative-edge-triggered flip-flop, preset, shared clock and clear			14	SN74LS114A
74x115	2	dual J-K master-slave flip-flop, data lockout, reset			14	TL74115N
74116, 74L116	2	dual 4-bit latch, clear			24	SN74116
74H116	1	AND-gated J-K flip flop	?	?	14	MC74H116
74x117	1	AND-gated J-K flip flop, one J and K input inverted	?	?	14	MC74H117
74x118	6	hex set/reset latch, shared reset			16	ITT74118
74119	6	hex set/reset latch			24	TL74119N
74H119	2	dual J-K flip-flop, shared clock and clear	?	?	14	MC74H119
74120	2	dual pulse synchronizer/drivers	15 kΩ pull-up		16	SN74120
74H120	2	dual J-K flip-flop, separate clock inputs	?	?	14	MC74H120
74x121	1	monostable multivibrator	Schmitt trigger		14	SN74121
74x122	1	retriggerable monostable multivibrator, clear			14	SN74LS122
74x123	2	dual retriggerable monostable multivibrator, clear			16	SN74LS123
74x124	2	dual voltage-controlled oscillator	analog		16	SN74S124
74x125	4	quad bus buffer, negative enable		three-state	14	SN74LS125A
74x126	4	quad bus buffer, positive enable		three-state	14	SN74LS126A
74x128	4	quad 2-input NOR gate		driver 50 Ω	14	SN74128
74x130	2	retriggerable monostable multivibrator			16	SN74130
74131	4	quad 2-input AND gate		open-collector 15 V	14	ITT74131
74AS131, 74ALS131	1	3-to-8 line decoder/demultiplexer, address register, inverting outputs			16	SN74AS131
74x132	4	quad 2-input NAND gate	Schmitt trigger		14	SN74LS132
74x133	1	single 13-input NAND gate			16	SN74ALS133
74x134	1	single 12-input NAND gate		three-state	16	SN74S134
74x135	4	quad XOR/XNOR gate, two inputs to select logic type			16	SN74S135
74x136	4	quad 2-input XOR gate		open-collector	14	SN74LS136
74x137	1	3-to-8 line decoder/demultiplexer, address latch, inverting outputs			16	SN74LS137
74x138	1	3-to-8 line decoder/demultiplexer, inverting outputs			16	SN74LS138
74x139	2	dual 2-to-4 line decoder/demultiplexer, inverting outputs			16	SN74LS139A
74x140	2	dual 4-input NAND gate		driver 50 Ω	14	SN74S140
74x141	1	BCD to decimal decoder/driver for cold-cathode indicator / Nixie tube		open-collector 60 V	16	DM74141
74x142	1	decade counter/latch/decoder/driver for Nixie tubes		open-collector 60 V	16	SN74142
74x143	1	decade counter/latch/decoder/7-segment driver		constant current 15 mA	24	SN74143
74x144	1	decade counter/latch/decoder/7-segment driver		open-collector 15 V / 25 mA	24	SN74144
74x145	1	BCD to decimal decoder/driver		open-collector 15 V / 80 mA	16	SN74LS145
74x146	1	3-to-8 line decoder				MCE74H146
74x147	1	10-line to 4-line priority encoder			16	SN74LS147
74x148	1	8-line to 3-line priority encoder			16	SN74LS148
74x149	1	8-line to 8-line priority encoder			20	MM74HCT149
74x150	1	16-line to 1-line data selector/multiplexer			24	SN74150
74x151	1	8-line to 1-line data selector/multiplexer			16	SN74LS151
74x152	1	8-line to 1-line data selector/multiplexer, inverting output			14	SN54152A
74x153	2	dual 4-line to 1-line data selector/multiplexer, non-inverting outputs			16	SN74LS153
74x154	1	4-to-16 line decoder/demultiplexer, inverting outputs			24	SN74154
74x155	2	dual 2-to-4 line decoder/demultiplexer, inverting outputs			16	SN74LS155A
74x156	2	dual 2-to-4 line decoder/demultiplexer, inverting outputs		open-collector	16	SN74LS156
74x157	4	quad 2-line to 1-line data selector/multiplexer, non-inverting outputs			16	SN74LS157
74x158	4	quad 2-line to 1-line data selector/multiplexer, inverting outputs			16	SN74LS158
74x159	1	4-to-16 line decoder/demultiplexer		open-collector	24	SN74159
74x160	1	synchronous presettable 4-bit decade counter, asynchronous clear			16	SN74LS160A
74x161	1	synchronous presettable 4-bit binary counter, asynchronous clear			16	SN74LS161A
74x162	1	synchronous presettable 4-bit decade counter, synchronous clear			16	SN74LS162A
74x163	1	synchronous presettable 4-bit binary counter, synchronous clear			16	SN74LS163A
74x164	1	8-bit serial-in parallel-out (SIPO) shift register, asynchronous clear, not output latch			14	SN74164
74x165	1	8-bit parallel-in serial-out (PISO) shift register, parallel load, complementary outputs			16	SN74LS165A
74x166	1	parallel-load 8-bit shift register			16	SN74LS166A
74x167	1	synchronous decade rate multiplier			16	SN74167
74x168	1	synchronous presettable 4-bit up/down decade counter			16	DM74LS168
74x169	1	synchronous presettable 4-bit up/down binary counter			16	SN74LS169B
74x170	1	16-bit register file (4x4)		open-collector	16	SN74170
74x171	4	quad D flip-flops, shared clock and clear			16	SN74LS171
74x172	1	16-bit multiple port register file (8x2)		three-state	24	SN74172
74x173	4	quad D flip-flop, shared clock and asynchronous clear and enable, Q & /Q outputs		three-state	16	SN74LS173A
74x174	6	hex D flip-flop, shared clock and asynchronous clear, Q outputs			16	SN74LS174
74x175	4	quad D edge-triggered flip-flop, shared clock and asynchronous clear, Q & /Q outputs			16	SN74LS175
74x176	1	presettable decade (bi-quinary) counter/latch			14	SN74176
74x177	1	presettable binary counter/latch			14	SN74177
74x178	1	4-bit parallel-access shift register			14	SN74178
74x179	1	4-bit parallel-access shift register, asynchronous clear input, complementary Q_{d} output			16	SN74179
74x180	1	9-bit odd/even parity bit generator and checker			14	SN74180
74x181	1	4-bit arithmetic logic unit and function generator			24	SN74LS181
74x182	1	lookahead carry generator			16	SN74S182
74x183	2	dual carry-save full adder			14	SN74LS183
74x184	1	BCD to binary converter		open-collector	16	SN74184
74x185	1	6-bit binary to BCD converter		open-collector	16	SN74185A
74x186	1	512-bit ROM (64x8)		open-collector	24	SN74186
74x187	1	1024-bit ROM (256x4)		open-collector	16	SN74187
74x188	1	256-bit PROM (32x8)		open-collector	16	SN74S188
74x189	1	64-bit RAM (16x4), 4 data inputs, 4 inverted data outputs		three-state	16	SN74S189
74x190	1	synchronous presettable up/down 4-bit decade counter			16	SN74LS190
74x191	1	synchronous presettable up/down 4-bit binary counter			16	SN74LS191
74x192	1	synchronous presettable up/down 4-bit decade counter, clear			16	SN74LS192
74x193	1	synchronous presettable up/down 4-bit binary counter, clear			16	SN74LS193
74x194	1	4-bit bidirectional universal shift register			16	SN74194
74x195	1	4-bit parallel-access shift register			16	SN74195
74x196	1	presettable 4-bit decade counter/latch			14	SN74196
74x197	1	presettable 4-bit binary counter/latch			14	SN74197
74x198	1	8-bit bidirectional universal shift register			24	SN74198
74x199	1	8-bit universal shift register, J-NotK serial inputs			24	SN74199
=== 74x200 – 74x299 === Part number	Units	Description	Input	Output	Pins	Datasheet
74x200	1	256-bit RAM (256x1)		three-state	16	DM74S200
74x201	1	256-bit RAM (256x1)		three-state	16	SN74S201
74x202	1	256-bit RAM (256x1) with power down		three-state	16	SN74LS202
74x206	1	256-bit RAM (256x1)		open-collector	16	DM74S206
74x207	1	1024-bit RAM (256x4)		three-state	16	SN74LS207
74x208	1	1024-bit RAM (256x4), separate data in- and outputs		three-state	20	SN74LS208
74x209	1	1024-bit RAM (1024x1)		three-state	16	SN74S209
74x210	8	octal buffer, inverting		three-state	20	SN74LS210
74x211	1	144-bit RAM (16x9) with output latch		three-state	20	74F211
74x212	1	144-bit RAM (16x9)		three-state	20	74F212
74x213	1	192-bit RAM (16x12)		three-state	20	74F213
74x214	1	1024-bit RAM (1024x1)		three-state	16	SN74LS214
74x215	1	1024-bit RAM (1024x1) with power-down mode		three-state	16	SN74LS215
74x216	1	256-bit RAM (64x4), common I/O		three-state	16	SN74LS216
74x217	1	256-bit RAM (64x4)		three-state	20	SN74ALS217
74x218	1	256-bit RAM (32x8)		three-state	20	SN74ALS218
74x219	1	64-bit RAM (16x4), non-inverting outputs		three-state	16	SN74LS219
74x221	2	dual monostable multivibrator	Schmitt trigger		16	SN74LS221
74x222	1	64-bit FIFO memory (16x4), synchronous, input/output ready enable		three-state	20	SN74LS222
74x224	1	64-bit FIFO memory (16x4), synchronous		three-state	16	SN74LS224
74x225	1	80-bit FIFO memory (16x5), asynchronous		three-state	20	SN74S225
74x226	1	4-bit parallel latched bus transceiver		three-state	16	SN74S226
74x227	1	64-bit FIFO memory (16x4), synchronous, input/output ready enable		open-collector	20	SN74LS727
74x228	1	64-bit FIFO memory (16x4), synchronous		open-collector	20	SN74LS728
74x229	1	80-bit FIFO memory (16x5), asynchronous		three-state	20	SN74ALS229B
74x230	2	dual 4-bit buffer/driver, one inverted, one non-inverted; negative enable		three-state	20	SN74AS230
74x231	2	dual 4-bit buffer/driver, both inverted; one positive and one negative enable		three-state	20	SN74AS231
74x232	1	64-bit FIFO memory (16x4), asynchronous		three-state	16	SN74ALS232B
74x233	1	80-bit FIFO memory (16x5), asynchronous		three-state	20	SN74ALS233B
74x234	1	256-bit FIFO memory (64x4), asynchronous		three-state	16	SN74ALS234
74x235	1	320-bit FIFO memory (64x5), asynchronous		three-state	20	SN74ALS235
74x236	1	256-bit FIFO memory (64x4), asynchronous		three-state	16	SN74ALS236
74x237	1	3-to-8 line decoder/demultiplexer, address latch, active high outputs			16	CD74HC237
74x238	1	3-to-8 line decoder/demultiplexer, active high outputs			16	CD74HC238
74x239	2	dual 2-to-4 line decoder/demultiplexer, active high outputs			16	SN74HC239
74x240	8	octal buffer, inverting outputs	Schmitt trigger	three-state	20	SN74LS240
74x241	8	octal buffer, non-inverting outputs	Schmitt trigger	three-state	20	SN74LS241
74x242	4	quad bus transceiver, inverting outputs	Schmitt trigger	three-state	14	SN74LS242
74x243	4	quad bus transceiver, non-inverting outputs	Schmitt trigger	three-state	14	SN74LS243
74x244	8	octal buffer, non-inverting outputs	Schmitt trigger	three-state	20	SN74LS244
74x245	8	octal bus transceiver, non-inverting outputs	Schmitt trigger	three-state	20	SN74LS245
74x246	1	BCD to 7-segment decoder/driver		open-collector 30 V	16	SN74246
74x247	1	BCD to 7-segment decoder/driver		open-collector 15 V	16	SN74LS247
74x248	1	BCD to 7-segment decoder/driver		open-collector, 2 kΩ pull-up	16	SN74LS248
74x249	1	BCD to 7-segment decoder/driver		open-collector	16	SN74249
74x250	1	1 of 16 data selector/multiplexer		three-state	24	SN74AS250
74x251	1	8-line to 1-line data selector/multiplexer, complementary outputs		three-state	16	SN74LS251
74x253	2	dual 4-line to 1-line data selector/multiplexer		three-state	16	SN74LS253
74x255	2	dual 2-to-4 line decoder/demultiplexer, inverting outputs		three-state	16	74LS255
74x256	2	dual 4-bit addressable latch			16	MC74F256
74x257	4	quad 2-line to 1-line data selector/multiplexer, non-inverting outputs		three-state	16	SN74LS257B
74x258	4	quad 2-line to 1-line data selector/multiplexer, inverting outputs		three-state	16	SN74LS258B
74x259	1	8-bit bit addressable input latch with clr			16	SN74LS259B
74x260	2	dual 5-input NOR gate			14	SN74LS260
74x261	1	2-bit by 4-bit parallel binary multiplier			16	SN74LS261
74x262	1	5760-bit ROM (Teletext character set, 128 characters 5x9)		three-state	20	SN74S262N
74AS264	1	look ahead carry generator			16	SN74AS264
74HCS264	1	8-bit serial-in parallel-out (SIPO) shift register, asynchronous clear, inverted output	Schmitt trigger		(16)	SN74HCS264
74x265	4	quad complementary output elements			16	SN74265
74x266	4	quad 2-input XNOR gate		open-collector	14	SN74LS266
74x268	6	hex D-type latches, shared enable and output control		three-state	16	SN74S268
74x269	1	8-bit bidirectional binary counter			24	MC74F269
74x270	1	2048-bit ROM (512x4)		open-collector	16	SN74S270
74x271	1	2048-bit ROM (256x8)		open-collector	20	SN74S271
74x273	1	8-bit register, asynchronous clear			20	SN74LS273
74x274	1	4-bit by 4-bit binary multiplier		three-state	20	SN74S274
74x275	1	7-bit slice Wallace tree		three-state	16	SN74S275
74x276	4	quad J-NotK edge-triggered flip-flops, separate clocks, shared preset and clear			20	SN74276
74x278	1	4-bit cascadeable priority registers, latched data inputs			14	SN74278
74x279	4	quad set-reset latch			16	SN74LS279A
74x280	1	9-bit odd/even parity bit generator/checker			14	SN74LS280
74x281	1	4-bit parallel binary accumulator			24	SN74S281
74x282	1	look-ahead carry generator, selectable carry inputs			20	SN74AS282
74x283	1	4-bit binary full adder (has carry in function)			16	SN74LS283
74x284	1	4-bit by 4-bit parallel binary multiplier (high order 4 bits of product)			16	SN74284
74x285	1	4-bit by 4-bit parallel binary multiplier (low order 4 bits of product)			16	SN74285
74x286	1	9-bit parity generator/checker, bus driver parity I/O port			14	SN74AS286
74x287	1	1024-bit PROM (256x4)		three-state	16	SN74S287
74x288	1	256-bit PROM (32x8)		three-state	16	SN74S288
74x289	1	64-bit RAM (16x4), 4 data inputs, 4 inverted data outputs		open-collector	16	SN74S289
74x290	1	decade counter (separate divide-by-2 and divide-by-5 sections)			14	SN74LS290
74x292	1	programmable frequency divider/digital timer			16	SN74LS292
74x293	1	4-bit binary counter (separate divide-by-2 and divide-by-8 sections)			14	SN74LS293
74x294	1	programmable frequency divider/digital timer			16	SN74LS294
74x295	1	4-bit bidirectional shift register		three-state	14	SN74LS295B
74x297	1	digital phase-locked loop filter			16	SN74LS297
74x298	4	quad 2-input multiplexer, storage			16	SN74298
74x299	1	8-bit bidirectional universal shift/storage register		three-state	20	SN74LS299
=== 74x300 – 74x399 === Part number	Units	Description	Input	Output	Pins	Datasheet
74x300	1	256-bit RAM (256x1)		open-collector	16	SN74LS300A
74x301	1	256-bit RAM (256x1)		open-collector	16	SN74S301
74x302	1	256-bit RAM (256x1)		open-collector	16	SN74LS302
74x303	1	octal divide-by-2 clock driver, 2 outputs inverted			16	SN74AS303
74x304	1	octal divide-by-2 clock driver			16	SN74AS304
74x305	1	octal divide-by-2 clock driver, 4 outputs inverted			16	SN74AS305
74x306	1	8-bit LV-TTL to GTL+ bus transceiver		three-state and open-collector	(24)	SN74GTLPH306
74x309	1	1024-bit RAM (1024x1)		open-collector	16	SN74S309
74x310	8	octal buffer, inverting	Schmitt trigger	three-state	20	SN74LS310
74x311	1	144-bit RAM (16x9) with output latch		open-collector	20	74F311
74x312	1	144-bit RAM (16x9)		open-collector	20	74F312
74x313	1	192-bit RAM (16x12)		open-collector	20	74F313
74x314	1	1024-bit RAM (1024x1)		open-collector	16	SN74LS314
74x315	1	1024-bit RAM (1024x1) with power-down mode		open-collector	16	SN74LS315
74x316	1	256-bit RAM (64x4), common I/O		open-collector	16	SN74LS316
74x317	1	256-bit RAM (64x4)		open-collector	20	SN74ALS317
74x318	1	256-bit RAM (32x8)		open-collector	20	SN74ALS318
74x319	1	64-bit RAM (16x4)		open-collector	16	SN74LS319
74x320	1	crystal-controlled oscillator			16	SN74LS320
74x321	1	crystal-controlled oscillators, F/2 and F/4 count-down outputs			16	SN74LS320
74x322	1	8-bit shift register, sign extend		three-state	20	SN74LS322A
74x323	1	8-bit bidirectional universal shift/storage register, synchronous clear		three-state	20	SN74LS323
74x324	1	voltage-controlled oscillator (or crystal controlled), enable input, complementary outputs	analog		14	SN74LS324
74x325	2	dual voltage-controlled oscillator (or crystal controlled), complementary outputs	analog		16	SN74LS325
74x326	2	dual voltage-controlled oscillator (or crystal controlled), enable input, complementary outputs	analog		16	SN74LS326
74x327	2	dual voltage-controlled oscillator (or crystal controlled)	analog		14	SN74LS327
74x330	1	PLA (12 inputs, 50 terms, 6 outputs)		three-state	20	SN74S330
74x331	1	PLA (12 inputs, 50 terms, 6 outputs)		open-collector, 2.5 kΩ pull-up	20	SN74S331
74x333	1	PLA (12 inputs, 32 terms, 6 outputs, 4 state registers)		three-state	24	SN74LS333
74x334	1	PLA (12 inputs, 32 terms, 6 outputs)		three-state	24	SN74LS334
74x335	1	PLA (12 inputs, 32 terms, 6 outputs, 4 state registers)		open-collector	24	SN74LS335
74x336	1	PLA (12 inputs, 32 terms, 6 outputs)		open-collector	24	SN74LS336
74x337	1	clock driver		three-state	20	SN74ABT337
74x340	8	octal buffer, inverting outputs	Schmitt trigger	three-state	20	SN74S340
74x341	8	octal buffer, non-inverting outputs	Schmitt trigger	three-state	20	SN74S341
74x344	8	octal buffer, non-inverting outputs	Schmitt trigger	three-state	20	SN74S344
74x347	1	BCD to 7-segment decoders/drivers, low voltage version of 7447		open-collector	16	SN74LS347
74x348	1	8 to 3-line priority encoder		three-state	16	SN74LS348
74x350	1	4-bit shifter		three-state	16	SN74S350
74x351	2	dual 8-line to 1-line data selectors/multiplexers, 4 common data inputs		three-state	20	SN74351
74x352	2	dual 4-line to 1-line data selectors/multiplexers, inverting outputs			16	SN74LS352
74x353	2	dual 4-line to 1-line data selectors/multiplexers, inverting outputs		three-state	16	SN74LS353
74x354	1	8-line to 1-line data selector/multiplexer, transparent registers		three-state	20	CD74HC354
74x355	1	8-line to 1-line data selector/multiplexer, transparent registers		open-collector	20	SN74LS355
74x356	1	8-line to 1-line data selector/multiplexer, edge-triggered registers		three-state	20	CD74HCT356
74x357	1	8-line to 1-line data selector/multiplexer, edge-triggered registers		open-collector	20	SN74LS357
74x361	1	bubble memory function timing generator			22	SN74LS361
74x362	1	four-phase clock generator/driver for Texas Instruments TMS9900			20	SN74LS362
74x363	1	octal transparent latch		three-state	20	SN74LS363
74x364	1	octal edge-triggered D-type register		three-state	20	SN74LS364
74x365	6	hex buffer, non-inverting outputs		three-state	16	SN74LS365A
74x366	6	hex buffer, inverting outputs		three-state	16	SN74LS366A
74x367	6	hex buffer, non-inverting outputs		three-state	16	SN74LS367A
74x368	6	hex buffer, inverting outputs		three-state	16	SN74LS368A
74x370	1	2048-bit ROM (512x4)		three-state	16	SN74S370
74x371	1	2048-bit ROM (256x8)		three-state	20	SN74S371
74x373	8	octal transparent latch		three-state	20	SN74LS373
74x374	8	octal register		three-state	20	SN74LS374
74x375	4	quad bistable latch			16	SN74LS375
74x376	4	quad J-NotK flip-flop, shared clock and clear			16	SN74376
74x377	1	8-bit register, clock enable			20	SN74LS377
74x378	1	6-bit register, clock enable			16	SN74LS378
74x379	1	4-bit register, clock enable and complementary outputs			16	SN74LS379
74x380	1	8-bit multifunction register (combines features of x374, x377, x273, x534 ICs)		three-state	24	SN74LS380
74x381	1	4-bit arithmetic logic unit/function generator, generate and propagate outputs			20	SN74LS381A
74x382	1	4-bit arithmetic logic unit/function generator, ripple carry and overflow outputs			20	SN74LS382
74x383	1	8-bit register		open-collector	20	SN74S383
74x384	1	8-bit by 1-bit two's complement multipliers			16	SN74LS384
74x385	4	quad serial adder/subtractor			20	SN74LS385
74x386	4	quad 2-input XOR gate			14	SN74LS386
74x387	1	1024-bit PROM (256x4)		open-collector	16	SN74S387
74x388	1	4-bit D-type register		three-state and standard	16	Am74S388
74x390	2	dual 4-bit decade counter, asynchronous clear			16	SN74LS390
74x393	2	dual 4-bit binary counter, asynchronous clear			14	SN74LS393
74x395	1	4-bit cascadable shift register		three-state	16	SN74LS395A
74x396	8	octal storage registers, parallel access			16	SN74LS396
74x398	4	quad 2-input multiplexers, storage and complementary outputs			20	SN74LS398
74x399	4	quad 2-input multiplexer, storage			16	SN74LS399
=== 74x400 – 74x499 === Part number	Units	Description	Input	Output	Pins	Datasheet
74x401	1	CRC generator/checker			14	74F401
74x402	1	serial data polynomial generator/checker			16	74F402
74x403	1	64-bit FIFO memory (16x4)		three-state	24	74F403
74x405	1	3-to-8 line decoder (equivalent to Intel 8205)			16	UCY74S405
74406	1	3-to-8 line decoder	?	?	14	MC74406P
74AVCA406	1	ESD-protected voltage-translation transceiver			(48)	SN74AVCA406
74x407	1	data access register		three-state	24	74F407
74408	1	8-bit parity tree			14	MC74408
74S408	1	controller/driver for 16k/64k/256k dRAM			48	SN74S408
74x409	1	controller/driver for 16k/64k/256k dRAM			48	SN74S409
74x410	1	64-bit RAM (16x4) with output register		three-state	18	74F410
74x411	1	FIFO RAM controller			40	74F411
74x412	1	multi-mode buffered 8-bit latches (equivalent to Intel 3212/8212)		three-state	24	SN74S412
74x413	1	256-bit FIFO memory (64x4)			16	74F413
74x414	1	interrupt priority controller for Intel 8080 (equivalent to Intel 8214)			24	UCY74S414
74416	1	modulo 10 counter, preload and clear inputs			16	MC74416
74S416	1	4-bit bidirectional bus transceiver, non-inverting (equivalent to Intel 8216)		three-state	16	UCY74S416
74x417	2	modulo 2 and modulo 5 counters, shared preload and clear inputs			16	MC74417
74418	1	modulo 16 counter, preload and clear inputs			16	MC74418
74F418	1	32-bit error detection and correction circuit		three-state	48	74F418
74419	2	dual modulo 4 counters, shared preload and clear inputs			16	MC74419
74S419	1	FIFO RAM controller			40	74S419
74x420	1	32-bit check bit / syndrome bit generator		three-state	48	74F420
74x422	1	retriggerable monostable multivibrators, two inputs			14	SN74LS422
74x423	2	dual retriggerable monostable multivibrator			16	SN74LS423
74424	2	dual voltage-controlled oscillator			14	MC74424
74LS424	1	two-phase clock generator/driver for Intel 8080 (equivalent to Intel 8224)			16	SN74LS424
74x425	4	quad bus buffers, active low enables		three-state	14	SN74425
74x426	4	quad bus buffers, active high enables		three-state	14	SN74426
74x428	1	system controller for Intel 8080A (equivalent to Intel 8228)			28	SN74S428
74x429	1	FIFO RAM controller		three-state	28	74LS429
74x430	1	cyclic redundancy checker/corrector			28	74F430
74x432	1	8-bit multi-mode buffered latch		three-state	24	74F432
74x433	1	256-bit FIFO memory (64x4)		three-state	24	74F433
74x436	1	line driver/memory driver circuits - MOS memory interface, damping output resistor			16	SN74S436
74x437	1	line driver/memory driver circuits - MOS memory interface			16	SN74S437
74x438	1	system controller for Intel 8080A (equivalent to Intel 8238)			28	SN74S438
74x440	4	quad tridirectional bus transceiver, non-inverting outputs		open-collector	20	SN74LS440
74x441	4	quad tridirectional bus transceiver, inverting outputs		open-collector	20	SN74LS441
74x442	4	quad tridirectional bus transceiver, non-inverting outputs		three-state	20	SN74LS442
74x443	4	quad tridirectional bus transceiver, inverting outputs		three-state	20	SN74LS443
74x444	4	quad tridirectional bus transceiver, inverting and non-inverting outputs		three-state	20	SN74LS444
74x445	1	BCD to decimal decoders/drivers		driver 80 mA	16	SN74LS445
74x446	4	quad bus transceivers, direction controls, inverting outputs		three-state	16	SN74LS446
74x447	1	BCD to 7-segment decoders/drivers, low voltage version of 74247		open-collector	16	SN74LS447
74x448	4	quad tridirectional bus transceiver, inverting and non-inverting outputs		open-collector	20	SN74LS448
74x449	4	quad bus transceivers, direction controls, non-inverting outputs		three-state	16	SN74LS449
74450	1	counter, latch, 7-segment decoder	?	open-collector	16	MC74450
74S450	1	8192-bit PROM (1024x8) with power-down		three-state	24	SN74S450
74LS450	1	16-to-1 multiplexer, complementary outputs			24	SN74LS450
74S451	1	8192-bit PROM (1024x8) with power-down		open-collector	24	SN74S451
74LS451	2	dual 8-to-1 multiplexer			24	SN74LS451
74x452	2	dual decade counter, synchronous	?	?	16	MC74452
74453	2	dual binary counter, synchronous	?	?	16	MC74453
74LS453	4	quad 4-to-1 multiplexer			24	SN74LS453
74x454	2	dual decade up/down counter, synchronous, preset input	?	?	24	MC74454
74455	2	dual binary up/down counter, synchronous, preset input	?	?	24	MC74455
74F455	1	octal buffer / line driver with parity, inverting		three-state	24	74F455
74456	1	4-bit NBCD full adder	?	?	16	MC74456
74F456	1	octal buffer / line driver with parity, non-inverting		three-state	24	74F456
74x458	1	nines complement / zero element	?	?	14	MC74458
74460	1	4-bit bus transfer switch	?	three-state	16	MC74460
74LS460	1	10-bit comparator			24	SN74LS460
74x461	1	8-bit presettable binary counter		three-state	24	SN74LS461
74x462	1	fiber-optic data-link transmitter		open-collector 100 mA and standard	20	SN74LS462
74x463	1	fiber-optic data-link receiver	analog		20	SN74LS463
74x465	8	octal buffer, non-inverting outputs		three-state	20	SN74LS465
74x466	8	octal buffers, inverting outputs		three-state	20	SN74LS466
74x467	8	octal buffers, non-inverting outputs		three-state	20	SN74LS467
74x468	8	octal buffers, inverting outputs		three-state	20	SN74LS468
74x469	1	8-bit synchronous up/down counter, parallel load and hold capability		three-state	24	SN74LS469
74x470	1	2048-bit PROM (256x8)		open-collector	20	SN74S470
74x471	1	2048-bit PROM (256x8)		three-state	20	SN74S471
74x472	1	4096-bit PROM (512x8)		three-state	20	SN74S472
74x473	1	4096-bit PROM (512x8)		open-collector	20	SN74S473
74x474	1	4096-bit PROM (512x8)		three-state	24	SN74S474
74x475	1	4096-bit PROM (512x8)		open-collector	24	SN74S475
74x476	1	4096-bit PROM (1024x4)		three-state	18	SN74S476
74x477	1	4096-bit PROM (1024x4)		open-collector	18	SN74S477
74x478	1	8192-bit PROM (1024x8)		three-state	24	SN74S478
74x479	1	8192-bit PROM (1024x8)		open-collector	24	SN74S479
74S480	1	single burst error recovery circuit			24	SN74S480
74FCT480	2	dual 8-Bit parity generator/checker		open-drain	28	CY74FCT480
74x481	1	4-bit slice cascadable processor elements			(48)	SN74S481
74x482	1	4-bit slice expandable control elements			20	SN74S482
74x484	1	BCD-to-binary converter		three-state	20	SN74S484A
74x485	1	binary-to-BCD converter		three-state	20	SN74S485A
74x488	1	IEEE-488 bus interface			48	74ACT488
74x490	2	dual decade counter			16	SN74490
74x491	1	10-bit binary up/down counter, limited preset		three-state	24	SN74LS491
74x498	1	8-bit bidirectional shift register, parallel inputs		three-state	24	SN74LS498
=== 74x500 – 74x599 === Part number	Units	Description	Input	Output	Pins	Datasheet
74x500	1	6-bit flash analog-to-digital converter (ADC)	analog		24	74F500
74x502	1	8-bit successive approximation register			16	74LS502
74x503	1	8-bit successive approximation register with expansion control			16	74LS503
74x504	1	12-bit successive approximation register with expansion control			24	74LS504
74x505	1	8-bit successive approximation ADC	analog	three-state	24	74F505
74x508	1	8-bit multiplier/divider			24	SN74S508
74x515	1	programmable mapping decoder (2-to-4 line decoder with 9 programmable enable inputs)			20	74HCT515
74x516	1	16-bit multiplier/divider			24	SN74S516
74x518	1	8-bit comparator	20 kΩ pull-up	open-collector	20	SN74ALS518
74x519	1	8-bit comparator		open-collector	20	SN74ALS519
74x520	1	8-bit comparator, inverting output	20 kΩ pull-up		20	SN74ALS520
74x521	1	8-bit comparator, inverting output			20	SN74ALS521
74x522	1	8-bit comparator, inverting output	20 kΩ pull-up	open-collector	20	SN74ALS522
74x524	1	8-bit registered comparator		open-collector	20	74F524
74x525	1	16-bit programmable counter			28	74F525
74x526	1	fuse programmable identity comparator, 16-bit			20	SN74ALS526
74x527	1	fuse programmable identity comparator, 8-bit + 4-bit conventional Identity comparator			20	SN74ALS527
74x528	1	fuse programmable Identity comparator, 12-bit			16	SN74ALS528
74x531	8	octal transparent latch		three-state	20	SN74S531
74x532	8	octal register		three-state	20	SN74S532
74x533	1	octal D-type transparent latch, inverting outputs		three-state	20	SN74ALS533A
74x534	1	octal D-type edge-triggered flip-flop, inverting outputs, shared clock and output enable		three-state	20	SN74ALS534A
74x535	1	octal transparent latch, inverting outputs		three-state	20	SN74S535
74x536	1	octal register, inverting outputs		three-state	20	SN74S536
74x537	1	BCD to decimal decoder		three-state	20	MC74F537
74x538	1	3-to-8 line decoder/demultiplexer		three-state	20	SN74ALS538
74x539	2	dual 2-to-4 line decoder/demultiplexer		three-state	20	SN74ALS539
74x540	1	octal buffer, inverting outputs	Schmitt trigger	three-state	20	SN74LS540
74x541	1	octal buffer, non-inverting outputs	Schmitt trigger	three-state	20	SN74LS541
74x543	1	octal registered transceiver, non-inverting		three-state	24	SN74F543
74x544	1	octal registered transceiver, inverting		three-state	24	MC74F544
74x545	1	octal bidirectional transceiver, non-inverting		three-state	20	74F545
74x546	1	8-bit bidirectional registered transceiver, non-inverting		three-state	24	SN74LS546
74LS547	1	8-bit bidirectional latched transceiver, non-inverting		three-state	24	SN74LS547
74F547	1	3-to-8 line decoder/demultiplexer with address latches and acknowledge output			20	74F547
74LS548	1	8-bit two-stage pipelined register		three-state	24	SN74LS548
74F548	1	3-to-8 line decoder/demultiplexer with acknowledge output			20	74F548
74x549	1	8-bit two-stage pipelined latch		three-state	24	SN74LS549
74x550	1	octal registered transceiver with status flags, non-inverting		three-state	28	74F550
74x551	1	octal registered transceiver with status flags, inverting		three-state	28	74F551
74x552	1	octal registered transceiver with parity and flags		three-state	28	74F552
74x556	1	16x16-bit multiplier slice		three-state	(84)	74S556
74x557	1	8-bit by 8-bit multiplier		three-state	40	SN74S557
74x558	1	8-bit by 8-bit multiplier		three-state	40	SN74S558
74x559	1	8-bit expandable two's complement multiplier/divider		three-state	24	74F559
74x560	1	4-bit decade counter		three-state	20	SN74ALS560A
74x561	1	synchronous 4-bit binary counter		three-state	20	SN74ALS561A
74x563	1	octal D-type transparent latch, inverting outputs		three-state	20	SN74ALS563B
74x564	1	octal D-type edge-triggered flip-flop, inverting outputs, shared clock and output enable		three-state	20	SN74ALS564B
74x566	1	8-bit bidirectional registered transceiver, inverting		three-state	24	SN74LS566
74x567	1	8-bit bidirectional latched transceiver, inverting		three-state	24	SN74LS567
74x568	1	decade up/down counter		three-state	20	SN74ALS568A
74x569	1	binary up/down counter		three-state	20	SN74ALS569A
74x570	1	2048-bit PROM (512x4)		open-collector	16	DM74S570
74x571	1	2048-bit PROM (512x4)		three-state	16	DM74S571
74x572	1	4096-bit PROM (1024x4)		open-collector	18	DM74S572
74x573	1	octal D-type transparent latch		three-state	20	SN74ALS573C
74x574	1	octal D-type edge-triggered flip-flop		three-state	20	SN74ALS574B
74x575	1	octal D-type edge-triggered flip-flop, synchronous clear		three-state	24	SN74ALS575A
74x576	1	octal D-type edge-triggered flip-flop, inverting outputs		three-state	20	SN74ALS576B
74x577	1	octal D-type edge-triggered flip-flop, synchronous clear, inverting outputs		three-state	24	SN74ALS577A
74x579	1	8-bit bidirectional binary counter		three-state	20	MC74F579
74x580	1	octal D-type transparent latch, inverting outputs		three-state	20	SN74ALS580B
74x582	1	4-bit BCD arithmetic logic unit			24	74F582
74x583	1	4-bit BCD adder			16	74F583
74x588	1	octal bidirectional transceiver with IEEE-488 termination resistors		three-state	20	74F588
74x589	1	8-bit shift register, input latch		three-state	16	SN74LS589
74x590	1	8-bit binary counter, output registers		three-state	16	SN74LS590
74x591	1	8-bit binary counter, output registers		open-collector	16	SN74LS591
74x592	1	8-bit binary counter, input registers			16	SN74LS592
74x593	1	8-bit binary counter, input registers		three-state	20	SN74LS593
74x594	1	8-bit shift registers, serial-in, parallel-out, output latches		buffered	16	SN74LS594
74x595	1	8-bit shift registers, serial-in, parallel-out, output latches, output enable		three-state	16	SN74LS595
74x596	1	8-bit shift registers, serial-in, parallel-out, output latches, output enable		open-collector	16	SN74LS596
74x597	1	8-bit shift registers, parallel-in, serial-out, input latches			16	SN74LS597
74x598	1	8-bit shift register, selectable parallel-in/out input latches		three-state	20	SN74LS598
74x599	1	8-bit shift registers, serial-in, parallel-out, output latches		open-collector	16	SN74LS599
=== 74x600 – 74x699 === Part number	Units	Description	Input	Output	Pins	Datasheet
74x600	1	dynamic memory refresh controller, transparent and burst modes, for 4K or 16K dRAM		three-state	20	SN74LS600A
74x601	1	dynamic memory refresh controller, transparent and burst modes, for 64K dRAM		three-state	20	SN74LS601A
74x602	1	dynamic memory refresh controller, cycle steal and burst modes, for 4K or 16K dRAM		three-state	20	SN74LS602A
74x603	1	dynamic memory refresh controller, cycle steal and burst modes, for 64K dRAM		three-state	20	SN74LS603A
74x604	1	octal 2-input multiplexer, latch, high-speed		three-state	28	SN74LS604
74x605	1	octal 2-input multiplexer, latch, high-speed		open-collector	28	SN74LS605
74x606	1	octal 2-input multiplexer, latch, glitch-free		three-state	28	SN74LS606
74x607	1	octal 2-input multiplexer, latch, glitch-free		open-collector	28	SN74LS607
74x608	1	memory cycle controller			16	SN74LS608
74x610	1	memory mapper, latched		three-state	40	SN74LS610
74x611	1	memory mapper, latched		open-collector	40	SN74LS611
74x612	1	memory mapper		three-state	40	SN74LS612
74x613	1	memory mapper		open-collector	40	SN74LS613
74x614	1	octal bus transceiver and register, inverting		open-collector	24	SN74ALS614
74x615	1	octal bus transceiver and register, non-inverting		open-collector	24	SN74ALS615
74x616	1	16-bit parallel error detection and correction		three-state	40	SN74ALS616
74x617	1	16-bit parallel error detection and correction		open-collector	40	SN74ALS617
74x620	1	octal bus transceiver, inverting		three-state	20	SN74LS620
74x621	1	octal bus transceiver, non-inverting		open-collector	20	SN74LS621
74x622	1	octal bus transceiver, inverting		open-collector	20	SN74LS622
74x623	1	octal bus transceiver, non-inverting		three-state	20	SN74LS623
74x624	1	voltage-controlled oscillator, enable control, range control, two-phase outputs	analog		14	SN74LS624
74x625	2	dual voltage-controlled oscillator, two-phase outputs	analog		16	SN74LS625
74x626	2	dual voltage-controlled oscillator, enable control, two-phase outputs	analog		16	SN74LS626
74x627	2	dual voltage-controlled oscillator	analog		14	SN74LS627
74x628	1	voltage-controlled oscillator, enable control, range control, external temperature compensation, two-phase outputs	analog		14	SN74LS628
74x629	2	dual voltage-controlled oscillator, enable control, range control	analog		16	SN74LS629
74x630	1	16-bit error detection and correction (EDAC)		three-state	28	SN74LS630
74x631	1	16-bit error detection and correction		open-collector	28	SN74LS631
74x632	1	32-bit parallel error detection and correction, byte-write		three-state	52	SN74ALS632
74x633	1	32-bit parallel error detection and correction, byte-write		open-collector	52	SN74ALS633
74x634	1	32-bit parallel error detection and correction		three-state	48	SN74ALS634
74x635	1	32-bit parallel error detection and correction		open-collector	48	SN74ALS635
74x636	1	8-bit parallel error detection and correction		three-state	20	SN74LS636
74x637	1	8-bit parallel error detection and correction		open-collector	20	SN74LS637
74x638	1	octal bus transceiver, inverting outputs		three-state and open-collector	20	SN74LS638
74x639	1	octal bus transceiver, non-inverting outputs		three-state and open-collector	20	SN74LS639
74x640	1	octal bus transceiver, inverting outputs		three-state	20	SN74LS640
74x641	1	octal bus transceiver, non-inverting outputs		open-collector	20	SN74LS641
74x642	1	octal bus transceiver, inverting outputs		open-collector	20	SN74LS642
74x643	1	octal bus transceiver, mix of inverting and non-inverting outputs		three-state	20	SN74LS643
74x644	1	octal bus transceiver, mix of inverting and non-inverting outputs		open-collector	20	SN74LS644
74x645	1	octal bus transceiver, non-inverting outputs		three-state	20	SN74LS645
74x646	1	octal bus transceiver/latch/multiplexer, non-inverting outputs		three-state	24	SN74ALS646A
74x647	1	octal bus transceiver/latch/multiplexer, non-inverting outputs		open-collector	24	SN74LS647
74x648	1	octal bus transceiver/latch/multiplexer, inverting outputs		three-state	24	SN74ALS648A
74x649	1	octal bus transceiver/latch/multiplexer, inverting outputs		open-collector	24	SN74LS649
74x651	1	octal bus transceiver/register, inverting outputs		three-state	24	SN74ALS651A
74x652	1	octal bus transceiver/register, non-inverting outputs		three-state	24	SN74ALS652A
74x653	1	octal bus transceiver/register, inverting outputs		three-state and open-collector	24	SN74ALS653
74x654	1	octal bus transceiver/register, non-inverting outputs		three-state and open-collector	24	SN74ALS654
74x655	1	octal buffer / line driver with parity, inverting		three-state	24	74F655
74x656	1	octal buffer / line driver with parity, non-inverting		three-state	24	74F656
74x657	1	octal bidirectional transceiver with 8-bit parity generator/checker		three-state	24	SN74F657
74x658	1	octal bus transceiver, parity, inverting		three-state	24	SN74HC658
74x659	1	octal bus transceiver, parity, non-inverting		three-state	24	SN74HC659
74x664	1	octal bus transceiver, parity, inverting		three-state	24	SN74HC664
74x665	1	octal bus transceiver, parity, non-inverting		three-state	24	SN74HC665
74x666	1	8-bit D-type transparent read-back latch, non-inverting		three-state	24	SN74ALS666
74x667	1	8-bit D-type transparent read-back latch, inverting		three-state	24	SN74ALS667
74x668	1	synchronous 4-bit decade up/down counter			16	SN74LS668
74x669	1	synchronous 4-bit binary up/down counter			16	SN74LS669
74x670	1	16-bit register file (4x4)		three-state	16	SN74LS670
74x671	1	4-bit bidirectional shift register/latch/multiplexer, direct clear		three-state	20	SN74LS671
74x672	1	4-bit bidirectional shift register/latch/multiplexer, synchronous clear		three-state	20	SN74LS672
74x673	1	16-bit serial-in, serial/parallel-out shift register, output storage registers		three-state	24	SN74LS673
74x674	1	16-bit parallel-in, serial-out shift register		three-state	24	SN74LS674
74x675	1	16-bit serial-in, serial/parallel-out shift register			24	74F675A
74x676	1	16-bit serial/parallel-in, serial-out shift register			24	74F676
74x677	1	16-bit address comparator, enable			24	SN74ALS677
74x678	1	16-bit address comparator, latch			24	SN74ALS678
74x679	1	12-bit address comparator, latch			20	SN74ALS679
74x680	1	12-bit address comparator, enable			20	SN74ALS680
74x681	1	4-bit parallel binary accumulator		three-state	20	SN74LS681
74x682	1	8-bit magnitude comparator, P>Q output	20 kΩ pull-up		20	SN74LS682
74x683	1	8-bit magnitude comparator, P>Q output	20 kΩ pull-up	open-collector	20	SN74LS683
74x684	1	8-bit magnitude comparator, P>Q output			20	SN74LS684
74x685	1	8-bit magnitude comparator, P>Q output		open-collector	20	SN74LS685
74x686	1	8-bit magnitude comparator, P>Q output, enable			24	SN74LS686
74x687	1	8-bit magnitude comparator, P>Q output, enable		open-collector	24	SN74LS687
74x688	1	8-bit magnitude comparator, enable			20	SN74LS688
74x689	1	8-bit magnitude comparator, enable		open-collector	20	SN74LS689
74x690	1	4-bit decimal counter/latch/multiplexer, asynchronous clear		three-state	20	SN74LS690
74x691	1	4-bit binary counter/latch/multiplexer, asynchronous clear		three-state	20	SN74LS691
74x692	1	4-bit decimal counter/latch/multiplexer, synchronous clear		three-state	20	SN74LS692
74x693	1	4-bit binary counter/latch/multiplexer, synchronous clear		three-state	20	SN74LS693
74x694	1	4-bit decimal counter/latch/multiplexer, synchronous and asynchronous clears		three-state	20	SN74ALS694
74x695	1	4-bit binary counter/latch/multiplexer, synchronous and asynchronous clears		three-state	20	SN74ALS695
74x696	1	4-bit decimal counter/register/multiplexer, asynchronous clear		three-state	20	SN74LS696
74x697	1	4-bit binary counter/register/multiplexer, asynchronous clear		three-state	20	SN74LS697
74x698	1	4-bit decimal counter/register/multiplexer, synchronous clear		three-state	20	SN74LS698
74x699	1	4-bit binary counter/register/multiplexer, synchronous clear		three-state	20	SN74LS699
=== 74x700 – 74x799 === Part number	Units	Description	Input	Output	Pins	Datasheet
74x700	1	octal dRAM driver, inverting		three-state	20	SN74S700
74x701	1	8-bit register/counter/comparator		three-state	24	74F701
74x702	1	8-bit registered read-back transceiver		three-state	24	74F702
74x705	1	arithmetic logic unit for digital signal processing applications		three-state	(84)	74ACT705
74x707	1	8-bit TTL-ECL shift register			20	74F707
74x708	1	576-bit FIFO memory (64x9)		three-state	28	74ACT708
74x710	1	8-bit single-supply TTL-ECL shift register			20	74F710
74x711	5	quint 2-to-1 multiplexers		three-state	20	74F711
74x712	5	quint 3-to-1 multiplexers			24	74F712
74x715	1	programmable video sync generator			20	74ACT715
74x716	1	programmable decade counter			16	SN74LS716
74x718	1	programmable binary counter			16	SN74LS718
74x723	1	576-bit FIFO memory (64x9)		three-state	28	74ACT723
74x724	1	voltage-controlled multivibrator	analog		8	SN74LS724
74x725	1	4608-bit FIFO memory (512x9)		three-state	28	74ACT725
74x730	1	octal dRAM driver, inverting		three-state	20	SN74S730
74x731	1	octal dRAM driver, non-inverting		three-state	20	SN74S731
74x732	1	4-bit 3-bus multiplexer, inverting		three-state	20	74F732
74x733	1	4-bit 3-bus multiplexer, non-inverting		three-state	20	74F733
74x734	1	octal dRAM driver, non-inverting		three-state	20	SN74S734
74x740	2	dual 4-bit line driver, inverting		three-state	20	SN74S740
74x741	2	dual 4-bit line driver, non-inverting, complementary enable inputs		three-state	20	SN74S741
74x742	1	octal line driver, inverting		open-collector	20	SN74ALS742
74x743	1	octal line driver, non-inverting		open-collector	20	SN74ALS743
74x744	2	dual 4-bit line driver, non-inverting		three-state	20	SN74S744
74x746	1	octal buffer / line driver, inverting	20 kΩ pull-up	three-state	20	SN74ALS746
74x747	1	octal buffer / line driver, non-inverting	20 kΩ pull-up	three-state	20	SN74ALS747
74x748	1	8 to 3-line priority encoder (glitch-less)			16	SN74LS748
74x756	1	octal buffer/line driver, inverting outputs		open-collector	20	SN74AS756
74x757	1	octal buffer/line driver, non-inverting outputs, complementary enable inputs		open-collector	20	SN74AS757
74x758	1	quadruple bus transceivers, inverting outputs		open-collector	14	SN74AS758
74x759	1	quadruple bus transceivers, non-inverting outputs		open-collector	14	SN74AS759
74x760	1	octal buffer/line driver, non-inverting outputs		open-collector	20	SN74ALS760
74x762	1	octal buffer/line driver, inverting and non-inverting outputs		open-collector	20	SN74ALS762
74x763	1	octal buffer/line driver, inverting outputs, complementary enable inputs		open-collector	20	SN74ALS763
74x764	1	dual-port dRAM controller			40	74F764
74x765	1	dual-port dRAM controller with address latch			40	74F765
74x776	1	8-bit latched transceiver for FutureBus		three-state and open-collector	28	SN74F776
74x777	3	triple latched transceiver		three-state and open-collector	20	74F777
74x779	1	8-bit bidirectional binary counter		three-state	16	MC74F779
74x783	1	synchronous address multiplexer for display systems			40	SN74LS783
74x784	1	8-bit serial/parallel multiplier with adder/subtractor			20	74F784
74x785	1	synchronous address multiplexer for display systems with 256-column refresh			40	SN74LS785
74x786	1	4-input asynchronous bus arbiter			16	74F786
74x790	1	error detection and correction (EDAC)		three-state	48	SN74ALS790
74x793	1	8-bit latch, readback			20	SN74LS793
74x794	1	8-bit register, readback			20	SN74LS794
74x795	1	octal buffer, non-inverting, shared enable		three-state	20	SN74LS795
74x796	1	octal buffer, inverting, shared enable		three-state	20	SN74LS796
74x797	1	octal buffer, non-inverting, enable for 4 buffers each		three-state	20	SN74LS797
74x798	1	octal buffer, inverting, enable for 4 buffers each		three-state	20	SN74LS798
=== 74x800 – 74x899 === Part number	Units	Description	Input	Output	Pins	Datasheet
74x800	3	triple 4-input AND/NAND drivers		driver	20	SN74AS800
74x802	3	triple 4-input OR/NOR drivers		driver	20	SN74AS802
74x803	4	quad D flip flops with matched propagation delays			14	MC74F803
74x804	6	hex 2-input NAND drivers		driver	20	SN74ALS804A
74x805	6	hex 2-input NOR drivers		driver	20	SN74ALS805A
74x807	1	1-to-10 clock driver		driver	20	IDT74FCT807
74x808	6	hex 2-input AND drivers		driver	20	SN74AS808B
74x810	4	quad 2-input XNOR gates			14	SN74ALS810
74x811	4	quad 2-input XNOR gates		open-collector	14	DM74ALS811
74x817	1	GTL+ to LV-TTL 1-to-6 fanout / LV-TTL to GTL+ 1-to-2 fanout driver		three-state and open-collector	(24)	SN74GTLP817
74x818	1	8-bit diagnostic register		three-state	24	74ACT818
74x819	1	8-bit diagnostic / pipeline register		three-state	24	SN74ALS819
74x821	1	10-bit bus interface flip-flop		three-state	24	SN74AS821A
74x822	1	10-bit bus interface flip-flop, inverting inputs		three-state	24	SN74AS822
74x823	1	9-bit D-type flip-flops, clear and clock enable inputs		three-state	24	SN74AS823A
74x824	1	9-bit D-type flip-flops, clear and clock enable inputs, inverting inputs		three-state	24	SN74AS824
74x825	1	8-bit D-type flip-flop, clear and clock enable inputs		three-state	24	SN74AS825A
74x826	1	8-bit D-type flip-flop, clear and clock enable inputs, inverting inputs		three-state	24	SN74AS826
74x827	1	10-bit buffer, non-inverting		three-state	24	MC74F827
74x828	1	10-bit buffer, inverting		three-state	24	MC74F828
74x832	6	hex 2-input OR drivers		driver	20	SN74ALS832A
74x833	1	8-bit to 9-bit bus transceiver with parity register, non-inverting		three-state	24	SN74ABT833
74x834	1	8-bit to 9-bit bus transceiver with parity register, inverting		three-state	24	IDT74FCT834
74x835	1	8-bit shift register with 2:1 input multiplexers, one input latched, serial output			24	74F835
74x839	1	field-programmable logic array 14x32x6		three-state	24	SN74PL839
74x840	1	field-programmable logic array 14x32x6		open-collector	24	SN74PL840
74x841	1	10-bit D-type latch		three-state	24	SN74ALS841
74x842	1	10-bit D-type latch, inverting inputs		three-state	24	SN74ALS842
74x843	1	9-bit D-type latch, clear and set inputs		three-state	24	SN74ALS843
74x844	1	9-bit D-type latch , clear and set inputs, inverting inputs		three-state	24	SN74ALS844
74x845	1	8-bit D-type latch, clear and set inputs		three-state	24	SN74ALS845
74x846	1	8-bit D-type latch, clear and set inputs, inverting inputs		three-state	24	SN74ALS846
74x848	1	8 to 3-line priority encoder (glitch-less)		three-state	16	SN74LS848
74x850	1	1 of 16 data selector/multiplexer, clocked select		three-state	28	SN74AS850
74x851	1	1 of 16 data selector/multiplexer		three-state	28	SN74AS851
74x852	1	8-bit universal transceiver port controller		three-state	24	SN74AS852
74x853	1	8-bit to 9-bit bus transceiver with parity latch, non-inverting		three-state	24	SN74ABT853
74x854	1	8-bit to 9-bit bus transceiver with parity latch, inverting		three-state	24	IDT74FCT854
74x856	1	8-bit universal transceiver port controller		three-state	24	SN74AS856
74x857	6	hex 2-line to 1-line multiplexer		three-state	24	SN74ALS857
74x861	1	10-bit bus transceiver, non-inverting		three-state	24	SN74ABT861
74x862	1	10-bit bus transceiver, inverting		three-state	24	SN74ABT862
74x863	1	9-bit bus transceiver, non-inverting		three-state	24	SN74ABT863
74x864	1	9-bit bus transceiver, inverting		three-state	24	74F864
74x866	1	8-bit magnitude comparator with latches			24	SN74AS866
74x867	1	synchronous 8-bit up/down counter, asynchronous clear			24	SN74ALS867A
74x869	1	synchronous 8-bit up/down counter, synchronous clear			24	SN74ALS869
74x870	1	dual 16x4 register files			24	SN74AS870
74x871	1	dual 16x4 register files			28	SN74AS871
74x873	2	dual 4-bit transparent latch with clear		three-state	24	SN74ALS873B
74x874	2	dual 4-bit edge-triggered D flip-flops with clear		three-state	24	SN74ALS874B
74x876	2	dual 4-bit edge-triggered D flip-flops with set, inverting outputs		three-state	24	SN74ALS876A
74x877	1	8-bit universal transceiver port controller		three-state	24	SN74AS877
74x878	2	dual 4-bit D-type flip-flop, synchronous clear, non-inverting outputs		three-state	24	SN74ALS878
74x879	2	dual 4-bit D-type flip-flop, synchronous clear, inverting outputs		three-state	24	SN74ALS879
74x880	2	dual 4-bit transparent latch with clear, inverting outputs		three-state	24	SN74ALS880
74x881	1	4-bit arithmetic logic unit			24	SN74AS881A
74x882	1	32-bit lookahead carry generator			24	SN74AS882
74x885	1	8-bit magnitude comparator			24	SN74AS885
74x887	1	8-bit processor element (non-cascadable version of 74x888)			(68)	SN74AS887
74x888	1	8-bit processor slice			64	SN74AS888
74x889	1	8-bit processor slice			(68)	SN74AS889
74x890	1	microoperation sequencer			64	SN74AS890
74x891	1	microoperation sequencer			(68)	SN74AS891
74x895	1	8-bit memory address generator			(68)	SN74AS895
74x897	1	16-bit parallel/serial barrel shifter			(68)	SN74AS897A
74x899	1	9-bit latchable transceiver with parity generator / checker		three-state	(28)	74AC899
=== 74x900 – 74x999 === Part number	Units	Description	Input	Output	Pins	Datasheet
74x900	4	quad 2-input NAND gate		driver	14	SN74ALS900
74x901	6	hex inverting TTL buffer			14	MM74C901
74C902	6	hex non-inverting TTL buffer			14	MM74C902
74ALS902	4	quad 2-input NOR gate		driver	14	SN74ALS902
74C903	6	hex inverting PMOS buffer			14	MM74C903
74ALS903	4	quad 2-input NAND gate		open-collector driver	14	SN74ALS903
74x904	6	hex non-inverting PMOS buffer			14	MM74C904
74x905	1	12-bit successive approximation register			24	MM74C905
74x906	6	hex open drain n-channel buffers		open-collector	14	MM74C906
74x907	6	hex open drain p-channel buffers			14	MM74C907
74x908	2	dual 2-input NAND 30 V / 250 mA relay driver			8	MM74C908
74x909	4	quad voltage comparator	analog	open-collector	14	MM74C909
74x910	1	256-bit RAM (64x4)		three-state	18	MM74C910
74x911	1	4-digit expandable display controller		three-state	28	MM74C911
74x912	1	6-digit BCD display controller and driver		three-state	28	MM74C912
74x913	1	6-digit BCD display controller and driver, no decimal point			24	MM74C913
74x914	6	hex inverter gate, extended input voltage	Schmitt trigger		14	MM74C914
74x915	1	7-segment to BCD converter		three-state	18	MM74C915
74x917	1	6-digit hex display controller and driver		three-state	28	MM74C917
74x918	2	dual 2-input NAND 30 V / 250 mA relay driver			14	MM74C918
74x920	1	1024-bit RAM (256x4), separate data inputs and outputs		three-state	22	MM74C920
74x921	1	1024-bit RAM (256x4)		three-state	18	MM74C921
74x922	1	16-key encoder		three-state	18	MM74C922
74x923	1	20-key encoder		three-state	20	MM74C923
74x925	1	4-digit counter/display driver			16	MM74C925
74x926	1	4-digit decade counter/display driver, carry out and latch (up to 9999)			16	MM74C926
74x927	1	4-digit timer counter/display driver (up to 9599, intended as time elapsed, i.e. 9:59.9 min)			16	MM74C927
74x928	1	4-digit counter/display driver (up to 1999)			16	MM74C928
74x929	1	1024-bit RAM (1024x1), single chip select		three-state	16	MM74C929
74x930	1	1024-bit RAM (1024x1), three chip selects		three-state	18	MM74C930
74x932	1	phase comparator			8	MM74C932
74x933	1	7-bit address bus comparator			20	MM74C933
74934	1	ADC similar to ADC0829, see corresponding NSC datasheet				
74x935	1	ADC for 3.5-digit digital voltmeters, multiplexed 7-segment display outputs	analog		28	MM74C935
74x936	1	ADC for 3.75-digit digital voltmeters, multiplexed 7-segment display outputs	analog		?	MM74C936
74x937	1	ADC for 3.5-digit digital voltmeters, multiplexed BCD outputs	analog		24	MM74C937
74x938	1	ADC for 3.75-digit digital voltmeters, multiplexed BCD outputs	analog		24	MM74C938
74x940	1	octal bus/line drivers/line receivers	Schmitt trigger	three-state	20	DM74S940
74x941	1	octal bus/line drivers/line receivers	Schmitt trigger	three-state	20	DM74S941
74x942	1	300 baud Bell 103 modem (+/- 5 V supply)			20	MM74HC942
74x943	1	300 baud Bell 103 modem (single 5 V supply)			20	MM74HC943
74x945	1	4-digit up/down counter, decoder and LCD driver, output latch			40	MM74C945
74x946	1	4.5-digit counter, decoder and LCD driver, leading zero blanking			40	MM74C946
74x947	1	4-digit up/down counter, decoder and LCD driver, leading zero blanking			40	MM74C947
74x948	1	8-bit ADC with 16-channel analog multiplexer	analog	three-state	40	MM74C948
74x949	1	8-bit ADC with 8-channel analog multiplexer	analog	three-state	28	MM74C949
74x950	1	8-bit ADC with 8-channel analog multiplexer and sample and hold	analog	three-state	28	MM74C950
74x952	1	dual rank 8-bit shift register, synchronous clear		three-state	18	DM74LS952
74C956	1	4-digit, 17-segment alpha-numeric LED display driver with memory and decoder			40	MM74C956
74BCT956	1	octal bus transceiver and latch		three-state	24	SN74BCT956
74x962	1	dual rank 8-bit shift register, register exchange mode		three-state	18	DM74LS962
74x963	1	dual rank 8-bit shift register, synchronous clear		three-state	20	SN74ALS963
74x964	1	dual rank 8-bit shift register, synchronous and asynchronous clear		three-state	20	SN74ALS964
74x968	1	controller/driver for 16k/64k/256k/1M dRAM			52	74F968
74x978	1	octal flip-flop with serial scanner			24	74F978
74x979	1	9-bit registered transceiver with parity generator/checker for FutureBus		three-state and open-collector	(48)	SN74BCT979
74x989	1	64-bit RAM (16x4), inverting output		three-state	16	MM74C989
74x990	1	8-bit D-type transparent read-back latch, non-inverting		three-state	20	SN74ALS990
74x991	1	8-bit D-type transparent read-back latch, inverting		three-state	20	SN74ALS991
74x992	1	9-bit D-type transparent read-back latch, non-inverting		three-state	24	SN74ALS992
74x993	1	9-bit D-type transparent read-back latch, inverting		three-state	24	SN74ALS993
74x994	1	10-bit D-type transparent read-back latch, non-inverting		three-state	24	SN74ALS994
74x995	1	10-bit D-type transparent read-back latch, inverting		three-state	24	SN74ALS995
74x996	1	8-bit D-type edge-triggered read-back latch		three-state	24	SN74ALS996
=== 74x1000 – 74x1999 === Part number	Units	Description	Input	Output	Pins	Datasheet
74x1000	4	quad 2-input NAND gate		driver	14	SN74AS1000A
74x1002	4	quad 2-input NOR gate		driver	14	SN74ALS1002A
74x1003	4	quad 2-input NAND gate		open-collector driver	14	SN74ALS1003A
74x1004	6	hex inverting buffer		driver	14	SN74ALS1004
74x1005	6	hex inverting buffer		open-collector driver	14	SN74ALS1005
74x1008	4	quad 2-input AND gate		driver	14	SN74AS1008A
74ALS1010	3	triple 3-input NAND gate		driver	14	SN74ALS1010A
74AC1010, 74ACT1010	1	16x16-bit multiplier/accumulator		three-state	64	74AC1010
74x1011	3	triple 3-input AND gate		driver	14	SN74ALS1011A
74F1016	16	16-bit Schottky diode R-C bus termination array			(20)	SN74F1016
74AC1016, 74ACT1016	1	16x16-bit multiplier		three-state	64	74AC1016
74x1017	1	16x16-bit parallel multiplier		three-state	64	74AC1017
74x1018	18	18-bit Schottky diode R-C bus termination array			(24)	SN74F1018
74x1020	2	dual 4-input NAND gate		driver	14	SN74ALS1020A
74x1032	4	quad 2-input OR gate		driver	14	SN74AS1032A
74x1034	6	hex non-inverting buffer		driver	14	SN74ALS1034
74x1035	6	hex non-inverting buffer		open-collector driver	14	SN74ALS1035
74x1036	4	quad 2-input NOR gate		driver	14	SN74ALS1036
74x1050	12	12-bit Schottky diode bus termination array, clamp to GND			16	SN74S1050
74x1051	12	12-bit Schottky diode bus termination array, clamp to GND/V_{CC}			16	SN74S1051
74x1052	16	16-bit Schottky diode bus termination array, clamp to GND			20	SN74S1052
74x1053	16	16-bit Schottky diode bus termination array, clamp to GND/V_{CC}			20	SN74S1053
74x1056	8	8-bit Schottky diode bus termination array, clamp to GND			(16)	SN74F1056
74x1071	10	10-bit bus termination array with bus-hold function			(14)	SN74ACT1071
74x1073	16	16-bit bus termination array with bus-hold function			(20)	SN74ACT1073
74x1074	2	dual D negative edge triggered flip-flop, asynchronous preset and clear			14	74FR1074
74x1181	1	4-bit arithmetic logic unit			24	SN74AS1181
74x1240	1	octal buffer / line driver, inverting (lower-power version of 74x240)		three-state	20	SN74ALS1240
74x1241	1	octal buffer / line driver, non-inverting (lower-power version of 74x241)		three-state	20	SN74ALS1241
74x1242	1	quad bus transceiver, inverting (lower-power version of 74x242)		three-state	14	SN74ALS1242
74x1243	1	quad bus transceiver, non-inverting (lower-power version of 74x243)		three-state	14	SN74ALS1243
74x1244	1	octal buffer / driver, non-inverting (lower-power version of 74x244)		three-state	20	SN74ALS1244
74x1245	1	octal bus transceiver (lower-power version of 74x245)		three-state	20	SN74ALS1245A
74x1280	1	9-bit parity generator/checker with registered outputs		three-state	20	QS74FCT1280
74x1284	1	parallel printer interface transceiver / buffer (IEEE 1284)			20	74HCT1284
74x1394	1	2-bit GTLP transceiver with split LV-TTL port		three-state and open-collector	(16)	SN74GTLP1394
74x1395	2	Dual 1-bit GTLP transceiver with split LV-TTL port		three-state and open-collector	(20)	SN74GTLP1395
74x1403	1	8-bit bus receiver plus 4-bit bus driver	Schmitt trigger	three-state	(32)	74LVT1403
74x1404	1	oscillator driver	Schmitt trigger		(8)	SN74LVC1404
74x1604	1	dual 8-bit transparent latch with output multiplexer			28	74F1604
74x1612	1	18-bit LV-TTL-to-GTLP adjustable-edge-rate universal bus transceiver		three-state and open-collector	(64)	SN74GTLPH1612
74ALS1616	1	16x16-bit multimode multiplier		three-state	64	SN74ALS1616
74GTLPH1616	1	17-bit LV-TTL-to-GTLP adjustable-edge-rate universal bus transceiver with buffered clock outputs		three-state and open-collector	(64)	SN74GTLPH1616
74x1620	1	octal bus transceiver, inverting		three-state	20	SN74ALS1620
74x1621	1	octal bus transceiver, non-inverting		open-collector	20	SN74ALS1621
74x1622	1	octal bus transceiver, inverting		open-collector	20	SN74ALS1622
74x1623	1	octal bus transceiver, non-inverting		three-state	20	SN74ALS1623
74x1627	1	18-bit LV-TTL-to-GTLP adjustable-edge-rate bus transceiver with source synchronous clock outputs		three-state and open-collector	(64)	SN74GTLPH1627
74x1631	1	quad bus driver with complementary outputs		three-state	16	SN74ALS1631
74x1638	1	octal bus transceiver, inverting (lower-power version of 74x638)		three-state and open-collector	20	SN74ALS1638
74x1639	1	octal bus transceiver, non-inverting (lower-power version of 74x639)		three-state and open-collector	20	SN74ALS1639
74x1640	1	octal bus transceiver, inverting (lower-power version of 74x640)		three-state	20	SN74ALS1640A
74x1641	1	octal bus transceiver, non-inverting (lower-power version of 74x641)		open-collector	20	SN74ALS641
74x1642	1	octal bus transceiver, inverting (lower-power version of 74x642)		open-collector	20	SN74ALS642
74x1643	1	octal bus transceiver, inverting and non-inverting (lower-power version of 74x643)		three-state	20	SN74ALS643
74x1644	1	octal bus transceiver, inverting and non-inverting (lower-power version of 74x644)		open-collector	20	SN74ALS644
74ALS1645	1	octal bus transceiver, non-inverting (lower-power version of 74x645)		three-state	20	SN74ALS1645A
74GTLPH1645	1	16-bit LV-TTL-to-GTLP adjustable-edge-rate bus transceiver		three-state and open-collector	(56)	SN74GTLPH1645
74x1650	2	dual 9-bit Futurebus universal storage transceiver with split TTL I/O		three-state and open-collector	(100)	SN74FB1650
74x1651	2	9-bit and 8-bit Futurebus universal storage transceivers with delayed buffered clock with split TTL I/O		three-state and open-collector	(100)	SN74FB1651
74x1653	2	9-bit and 8-bit Futurebus universal storage transceivers with delayed buffered clock with split 3.3V TTL I/O		three-state and open-collector	(100)	SN74FB1653
74x1655	2	dual 8-bit GTL universal storage transceivers with live insertion		three-state and open-collector	(64)	SN74GTL1655
74x1760	1	10-bit 4-way latched address multiplexer		three-state	64	74F1760
74x1761	1	dRAM and interrupt vector controller			48	74F1761
74x1762	1	dRAM address controller			40	74F1762
74x1763	1	single-port dRAM controller			48	74F1763
74x1764	1	dual-port dRAM controller			48	74F1764
74x1765	1	dual-port dRAM controller with address latch			48	74F1765
74x1766	1	burst mode dRAM controller			48	74F1766
74x1779	1	8-bit bidirectional binary counter		three-state	16	74F1779
74x1801	1	FM, MFM, and DM encoder / decoder, data rates up to 10 MHz			24	74LS1801
74x1802	1	SerDes with ECC and CRC, data rates up to 10 MHz		three-state	48	74LS1802
74x1803	1	quad clock driver			14	MC74F1803
74x1804	6	hex 2-input NAND		driver	20	DM74AS1804
74x1805	6	hex 2-input NOR		driver	20	DM74AS1805
74x1808	6	hex 2-input AND		driver	20	DM74AS1808
74x1811	1	FM, MFM, and DM encoder / decoder, data rates up to 20 MHz			24	74LS1811
74x1812	1	SerDes with ECC and CRC, data rates up to 30 MHz		three-state	48	74LS1812
74x1821	1	10-bit bus interface flip-flops		three-state	24	SN74AS1821
74x1823	1	9-bit bus interface flip-flops with clear		three-state	24	SN74AS1823
74x1832	6	hex 2-input OR		driver	20	DM74ALS1832
74x1841	1	10-bit bus interface transparent latches		three-state	24	SN74AS1841
74x1843	1	9-bit bus interface transparent latches with clear		three-state	24	SN74AS1843
=== 74x2000 – 74x2999 === Part number	Units	Description	Input	Output	Pins	Datasheet
74x2000	1	direction discriminator with microprocessor interface		three-state	28	SN74LS2000
74x2003	1	8-bit level translator			(20)	SN74GTL2003
74x2006	1	13-bit GTL to 3.3V TTL level translator		open-collector	(28)	SN74GTL2006
74x2007	1	12-bit GTL to 3.3V TTL level translator		open-collector	(28)	SN74GTL2007
74x2010	1	10-bit level translator			(24)	SN74GTL2010
74x2014	1	4-bit GTL to TTL transceiver		three-state and open-collector	(14)	SN74GTL2014
74x2031	1	9-bit Futurebus address/data transceiver		three-state and open-collector	(48)	SN74FB2031
74x2032	1	9-bit Futurebus competition transceiver		three-state and open-collector	(48)	SN74FB2032
74FB2033	1	8-bit Futurebus registered transceiver with split TTL I/O		three-state and open-collector	(52)	SN74FB2033
74GTLP2033	1	8-bit GTLP registered transceiver with split LV-TTL I/O		three-state and open-collector	(48)	SN74GTLP2033
74x2034	1	8-bit GTLP adjustable-edge-rate registered transceiver with split LV-TTL I/O		three-state and open-collector	(48)	SN74GTLP2034
74x2040	1	8-bit Futurebus transceiver with split TTL I/O		three-state and open-collector	(48)	SN74FB2040
74x2041	1	7-bit Futurebus transceiver with split TTL I/O		three-state and open-collector	(52)	SN74FB2041
74x2107	1	12-bit GTL to 3.3V TTL level translator		open-collector	(28)	SN74GTL2107
74x2125	4	quad bus buffer		three-state, 25 Ω series resistor	(14)	TC74VCX2125
74x2140	1	8k x 18 cache data RAM		three-state	(52)	SN74ACT2140A
74x2150	1	512 x 8 cache address comparator			24	SN74ACT2150A
74ACT2151	1	1k x 11 cache address comparator			28	SN74ACT2151
74FCT2151	1	8-line to 1-line multiplexer		25 Ω series resistor	(16)	CD74FCT2151
74x2152	1	2k x 8 cache address comparator			28	SN74ACT2152A
74ACT2153	1	1k x 11 cache address comparator		open-collector	28	SN74ACT2153
74FCT2153	2	dual 4-line to 1-line multiplexer		25 Ω series resistor	(16)	CD74FCT2153
74x2154	1	2k x 8 cache address comparator		open-collector	28	SN74ACT2154A
74x2155	1	2k x 8 burst cache address comparator		three-state	(44)	SN74ACT2155
74x2156	1	16k x 4 burst cache address comparator		three-state	(44)	SN74ACT2156
74ACT2157	1	2k x 16 cache address comparator		three-state	(44)	SN74ACT2157
74FCT2157	4	quad 2-line to 1-line multiplexer		25 Ω series resistor	(16)	CD74FCT2157
74x2158	1	8k x 9 cache address comparator		three-state	(44)	SN74ACT2158
74x2159	1	8k x 9 cache address comparator		three-state	(44)	SN74ACT2159
74x2160	1	8k x 4 2-way cache address comparator		three-state	(32)	SN74ACT2160
74x2161	1	synchronous presettable 4-bit binary counter, asynchronous clear		25 Ω series resistor	16	QS74FCT2161T
74ACT2163, 74BCT2163	1	16k x 5 cache address comparator		three-state	(32)	SN74ACT2163
74FCT2163	1	synchronous presettable 4-bit binary counter, synchronous clear		25 Ω series resistor	16	QS74FCT2163T
74x2164	1	16k x 5 cache address comparator		three-state	(32)	SN74ACT2164
74x2166	1	16k x 5 cache address comparator with input latches		three-state	(32)	SN74BCT2166
74x2191	1	synchronous presettable 4-bit binary up/down counter, up/down direction pin		25 Ω series resistor	16	QS74FCT2191T
74x2193	1	synchronous presettable 4-bit binary counter, separate up/down clocks		25 Ω series resistor	16	QS74FCT2193T
74x2226	2	dual 64-bit FIFO memories (64x1)			(24)	SN74ACT2226
74x2227	2	dual 64-bit FIFO memories (64x1)		three-state	(28)	SN74ACT2227
74x2228	2	dual 256-bit FIFO memories (256x1)			(24)	SN74ACT2228
74x2229	2	dual 256-bit FIFO memories (256x1)		three-state	(28)	SN74ACT2229
74x2232	1	512-bit FIFO memory (64x8)		three-state	24	SN74ALS2232A
74x2233	1	576-bit FIFO memory (64x9)		three-state	28	SN74ALS2233A
74x2235	1	18432-bit bidirectional FIFO memory (2x1024x9)		three-state	(44)	SN74ACT2235
74x2236	1	18432-bit bidirectional FIFO memory (2x1024x9)		three-state	(44)	SN74ACT2236
74x2238	1	576-bit bidirectional FIFO memory (2x32x9)		three-state	40	SN74ALS2238
74x2240	2	dual 4-bit bidirectional buffer / line driver, inverting		three-state, 25 Ω series resistor	20	SN74BCT2240
74x2241	2	dual 4-bit bidirectional buffer / line driver, non-inverting		three-state, 25 Ω series resistor	20	SN74BCT2241
74x2242	1	4-bit bus transceiver, inverting		three-state, 25 Ω series resistor	14	SN74ALS2242
74x2243	1	4-bit bus transceiver, non-inverting		three-state, 25 Ω series resistor	(14)	74F2243
74x2244	2	dual 4-bit buffer / line driver, non-inverting		three-state, 25 Ω series resistor	20	SN74BCT2244
74x2245	1	octal bus transceiver		three-state, 25 Ω series resistor	20	SN74ABT2245
74x2253	2	dual 4-line to 1-line multiplexer		three-state, 25 Ω series resistor	(16)	CD74FCT2253
74x2257	4	quad 2-line to 1-line multiplexer		three-state, 25 Ω series resistor	(16)	CD74FCT2257
74x2273	8	octal D-type flip-flop, shared clock and clear		25 Ω series resistor	(20)	CD74FCT2273
74x2299	1	8-bit universal shift register		three-state, 25 Ω series resistor	20	QS74FCT2299T
74x2323	2	dual line receiver	analog		(8)	SN74LS2323
74x2373	1	8-bit transparent latch		three-state, 25 Ω series resistor	(20)	CD74FCT2373
74x2374	8	octal D-type flip-flop, shared clock		three-state, 25 Ω series resistor	(20)	CD74FCT2374
74x2377	1	8-bit register, clock enable		25 Ω series resistor	20	QS74FCT2377T
74x2400	2	dual 4-bit buffer, inverting	Schmitt trigger	three-state	20	74THC2400
74x2410	1	11-bit MOS memory driver, non-inverting		three-state, 25 Ω series resistor	28	SN74BCT2410
74x2411	1	11-bit MOS memory driver, inverting		three-state, 25 Ω series resistor	28	SN74BCT2411
74x2414	2	dual 2-to-4 line decoder with supply voltage monitor			20	SN74BCT2414
74x2420	1	16-bit NuBus address/data transceiver and register		three-state	(68)	SN74BCT2420
74x2423	1	16-bit latched multiplexer/demultiplexer NuBus transceiver, inverting		three-state	(68)	SN74BCT2423
74x2424	1	16-bit latched multiplexer/demultiplexer NuBus transceiver, non-inverting		three-state	(68)	SN74BCT2424
74x2425	1	Macintosh Coprocessor Platform NuBus address/data registered transceiver		three-state	(100)	SN74BCT2425
74x2440	1	NuBus interface controller			(68)	SN74ACT2440
74x2441	1	NuBus interface controller			(100)	SN74ACT2441
74x2442	1	NuBus block slave address generator		three-state	(20)	SN74ALS2442
74x2509	1	9-output clock driver with PLL		three-state	(24)	HD74CDC2509
74x2510	1	10-output clock driver with PLL		three-state	(24)	HD74CDC2510
74x2525	1	8-output clock driver			14	74AC2525
74x2526	1	8-output clock driver with input multiplexer			16	74AC2526
74x2533	1	8-bit bus interface latch, inverting		three-state, 25 Ω series resistor	20	QS74FCT2533T
74x2534	1	8-bit bus interface register, inverting		three-state, 25 Ω series resistor	20	QS74FCT2534T
74x2540	1	8-bit buffer / line driver, inverting		three-state, 25 Ω series resistor	20	SN74ALS2540
74x2541	1	8-bit buffer / line driver, non-inverting		three-state, 25 Ω series resistor	20	SN74ALS2541
74x2543	1	8-bit latched transceiver, non-inverting		three-state, 25 Ω series resistor	24	QS74FCT2543T
74x2544	1	8-bit latched transceiver, inverting		three-state, 25 Ω series resistor	24	QS74FCT2544T
74x2573	1	8-bit transparent latch		three-state, 25 Ω series resistor	20	QS74FCT2573T
74x2574	8	octal D-type flip-flop, shared clock		three-state, 25 Ω series resistor	20	QS74FCT2574T
74x2620	1	octal bus transceiver / MOS driver, inverting		three-state, 25 Ω series resistor	20	SN74AS2620
74x2623	1	octal bus transceiver / MOS driver, non-inverting		three-state, 25 Ω series resistor	20	SN74AS2623
74x2640	1	octal bus transceiver / MOS driver, inverting		three-state, 25 Ω series resistor	20	SN74AS2640
74x2643	1	octal bus transceiver, mix of inverting and non-inverting outputs		three-state, 25 Ω series resistor	20	74F2643
74x2645	1	octal bus transceiver / MOS driver, non-inverting		three-state, 25 Ω series resistor	20	SN74AS2645
74x2646	1	octal registered transceiver, non-inverting		three-state, 25 Ω series resistor	24	QS74FCT2646T
74x2648	1	octal registered transceiver, inverting		three-state, 25 Ω series resistor	24	QS74FCT2648T
74x2651	1	octal registered transceiver, inverting		three-state, 25 Ω series resistor	24	QS74FCT2651T
74x2652	1	octal registered transceiver, non-inverting		three-state, 25 Ω series resistor	24	QS74FCT2652T
74S2708	1	8192-bit PROM (1024x8)		three-state	24	SN74S2708
74AC2708	1	576-bit FIFO memory (64x9)		three-state	28	74AC2708
74x2725	1	4608-bit FIFO memory (512x9)			28	74ACT2725
74x2726	1	4608-bit bidirectional FIFO memory (512x9)			28	74ACT2726
74x2821	1	10-bit D-type flip-flop		three-state, 25 Ω series resistor	24	QS74FCT2821T
74x2823	1	9-bit D-type flip-flop with clear		three-state, 25 Ω series resistor	24	QS74FCT2823T
74x2825	1	8-bit D-type flip-flop with clear and clock enable		three-state, 25 Ω series resistor	24	QS74FCT2825T
74x2827	1	10-bit buffer, non-inverting		three-state, 25 Ω series resistor	24	SN74BCT2827A
74x2828	1	10-bit buffer, inverting		three-state, 25 Ω series resistor	24	SN74BCT2828A
74x2833	1	8-bit bus transceiver with parity error flip-flop		three-state, 25 Ω series resistor	24	QS74FCT2833T
74x2841	1	10-bit transparent latch		three-state, 25 Ω series resistor	24	QS74FCT2841T
74x2843	1	9-bit transparent latch with asynchronous reset		three-state, 25 Ω series resistor	24	QS74FCT2843T
74x2845	1	8-bit transparent latch with asynchronous reset and multiple output enable		three-state, 25 Ω series resistor	24	QS74FCT2845T
74x2853	1	8-bit bus transceiver with parity error latch		three-state, 25 Ω series resistor	24	QS74FCT2853T
74x2861	1	10-bit non-inverting bus transceiver		three-state, 25 Ω series resistor	24	QS74FCT2861T
74x2862	1	10-bit inverting bus transceiver		three-state, 25 Ω series resistor	24	QS74FCT2862T
74x2863	1	9-bit non-inverting bus transceiver with dual output enable		three-state, 25 Ω series resistor	24	QS74FCT2863T
74x2864	1	9-bit inverting bus transceiver with dual output enable		three-state, 25 Ω series resistor	24	QS74FCT2864T
74x2952	1	octal bus transceiver and register, non-inverting		three-state	24	SN74LVC2952A
74x2953	1	octal bus transceiver and register, inverting		three-state	24	74F2953
74x2960	1	error detection and correction (EDAC), equivalent to Am2960		three-state	48	MC74F2960
74x2961	1	4-bit EDAC bus buffer, inverting, equivalent to Am2961		three-state	24	MC74F2961A
74x2962	1	4-bit EDAC bus buffer, non-inverting, equivalent to Am2962		three-state	24	MC74F2962A
74x2967	1	controller/driver for 16k/64k/256k dRAM			48	SN74ALS2967
74x2968	1	controller/driver for 16k/64k/256k dRAM			48	SN74ALS2968
74x2969	1	memory timing controller for use with EDAC			48	MC74F2969
74x2970	1	memory timing controller for use without EDAC			24	MC74F2970
=== 74x3000 – 74x3999 === Part number	Units	Description	Input	Output	Pins	Datasheet
74x3004	1	selectable GTL voltage reference		analog	(6)	SN74GTL3004
74x3037	4	quad 2-input NAND gate		driver 30 Ω	16	74F3037
74x3038	4	quad 2-input NAND gate		open-collector driver 30 Ω	16	74F3038
74x3040	2	dual 4-input NAND gate		driver 30 Ω	16	74F3040
74x3125	4	quad FET bus switch, output enable active low			(14)	SN74CBT3125
74x3126	4	quad FET bus switch, output enable active high			(14)	SN74CBT3126
74FCT3244	2	dual 4-bit buffer / line driver		three-state	20	IDT74FCT3244
74CBT3244, 74FST3244	2	dual 4-bit FET bus switch			20	SN74CBT3244; IDT74FST3244
74FCT3245	1	octal bidirectional transceiver		three-state	20	IDT74FCT3245
74CBT3245, 74FST3245	1	octal FET bus switch			20	SN74CBT3245A; IDT74FST3245
74LVX3245	1	octal bidirectional voltage-translating transceiver		three-state	(24)	74LVX3245
74GTLPH3245	1	32-bit LV-TTL-to-GTLP adjustable-edge-rate bus transceiver		three-state and open-collector	(114)	SN74GTLPH3245
74x3251	1	8-line to 1-line FET multiplexer / demultiplexer			(16)	SN74CBT3251
74x3253	2	dual 4-line to 1-line FET multiplexer / demultiplexer			(16)	SN74CBT3253
74x3257	4	quad 2-line to 1-line FET multiplexer / demultiplexer			(16)	IDT74FST3257
74x3283	1	32-bit latchable transceiver with parity checker / generator		three-state	(120)	74ACTQ3283
74x3284	1	18-bit synchronous datapath multiplexer		three-state	(100)	74ABT3284
74x3305	2	dual FET bus switch with extended voltage range			(8)	SN74CBT3305C
74x3306	2	dual FET bus switch			(8)	SN74CBT3306
74x3345	1	octal FET bus switch, dual output enable			(20)	SN74CBT3345
74x3374	1	8-bit metastable-resistant D-type flip-flop		three-state	20	SN74AS3374
74x3383	1	5-bit 4-port FET bus exchange switch			24	IDT74FST3383
74x3384	2	dual 5-bit FET bus switch			24	IDT74FST3384
74x3386	1	5-bit 4-port FET bus exchange switch with extended voltage range			(24)	SN74CBT3386
74x3390	1	octal 2-line to 1-line FET multiplexer / bus switch			(28)	IDT74FST3390
74x3573	1	octal transparent latch		three-state	20	IDT74FCT3573
74x3574	1	octal D-type flip flop		three-state	20	IDT74FCT3574
74x3584	2	dual 5-bit FET bus switch		25 Ω series resistor	24	QS74QST3584
74x3611	1	2304-bit FIFO memory (64x36)		three-state	(120)	SN74ABT3611
74x3612	1	4608-bit bidirectional FIFO memory (2x64x36)		three-state	(120)	SN74ABT3612
74x3613	1	2304-bit FIFO memory (64x36)		three-state	(120)	SN74ABT3613
74x3614	1	4608-bit bidirectional FIFO memory (2x64x36)		three-state	(120)	SN74ABT3614
74x3622	1	18432-bit bidirectional FIFO memory (2x256x36)		three-state	(120)	SN74ACT3622
74x3631	1	18432-bit FIFO memory (512x36)		three-state	(120)	SN74ACT3631
74x3632	1	36864-bit bidirectional FIFO memory (2x512x36)		three-state	(120)	SN74ACT3632
74x3638	1	32768-bit bidirectional FIFO memory (2x512x32)		three-state	(120)	SN74ACT3638
74x3641	1	36864-bit FIFO memory (1024x36)		three-state	(120)	SN74ACT3641
74x3642	1	73728-bit bidirectional FIFO memory (2x1024x36)		three-state	(120)	SN74ACT3642
74x3651	1	73728-bit FIFO memory (2048x36)		three-state	(120)	SN74ACT3651
74x3708	1	8192-bit PROM (1024x8)		open-collector	24	SN74S3708
74x3807	1	1-to-10 clock driver		driver	20	IDT74FCT3807
74x3827	1	10-bit buffer		three-state	24	IDT74FCT3827
74x3857	1	10-bit FET bus switch with pull-down resistors	internal 10-kΩ pull down resistors		(24)	SN74CBTLV3857
74x3861	1	10-bit FET bus switch			(24)	SN74CBT3861
74x3862	1	10-bit FET bus switch with dual output enable			(24)	IDT74CBTLV3862
74x3893	1	quad Futurebus backplane transceiver		three-state and open-collector	(20)	MC74F3893A
74x3907	1	Pentium clock synthesizer		three-state	(28)	IDT74FCT3907
74x3932	1	PLL-based clock driver		three-state	(48)	IDT74FCT3932
=== 74x4000 – 74x5999 === Part number	Units	Description	Input	Output	Pins	Datasheet
74x4002	2	dual 4-input NOR gate			14	CD74HC4002
74x4015	2	dual 4-bit shift registers			16	CD74HC4015
74x4016	4	quad bilateral switch		analog	14	CD74HC4016
74x4017	1	5-stage ÷10 Johnson counter			16	CD74HC4017
74x4020	1	14-stage binary counter			16	SN74HC4020
74x4022	1	4-stage ÷8 Johnson counter			14	SN74HC4022
74x4024	1	7-stage ripple carry binary counter			14	CD74HC4024
74x4028	1	BCD to decimal decoder			16	TC74HC4028P
74x4040	1	12-stage binary ripple counter			16	SN74HC4040
74x4046	1	phase-locked loop and voltage-controlled oscillator			16	CD74HC4046A
74x4049	6	hex inverting buffer			16	CD74HC4049
74x4050	6	hex buffer/converter (non-inverting)			16	CD74HC4050
74x4051	1	high-speed 8-channel analog multiplexer/demultiplexer		analog	16	CD74HC4051
74x4052	2	dual 4-channel analog multiplexer/demultiplexers		analog	16	CD74HC4052
74x4053	3	triple 2-channel analog multiplexer/demultiplexers		analog	16	CD74HC4053
74x4059	1	programmable divide-by-N counter			24	CD74HC4059
74x4060	1	14-stage binary ripple counter with oscillator			16	SN74HC4060
74x4061	1	14-stage asynchronous binary counter with oscillator			16	SN74HC4061
74x4066	4	quad single-pole single-throw analog switch			14	SN74HC4066
74x4067	1	16-channel analog multiplexer/demultiplexer		analog	24	CD74HC4067
74x4072	2	dual 4-input OR gate			14	TC74HC4072
74x4075	3	triple 3-input OR gate			14	CD74HC4075
74x4078	1	single 8-input OR/NOR gate			14	MM74HC4078
74x4094	1	8-bit three-state shift register/latch		three-state	16	CD74HC4094
74x4102	1	2-digit BCD presettable synchronous down counter			16	74HC4102
74x4103	1	8-bit binary presettable synchronous down counter			16	74HC4103
74x4245	1	8-bit 3V/5V translating transceiver		three-state	(24)	74LVX4245
74x4301	1	8-bit latch, inverting		three-state	20	MN74HC4301
74x4302	1	8-bit latch, non-inverting		three-state	20	MN74HC4302
74x4303	1	8-bit D-type flip-flop, inverting outputs		three-state	20	MN74HC4303
74x4304	1	8-bit D-type flip-flop, non-inverting outputs		three-state	20	MN74HC4304
74x4305	2	dual 4-bit buffer, inverting		three-state	20	MN74HC4305
74x4306	2	dual 4-bit buffer, non-inverting		three-state	20	MN74HC4306
74x4316	4	quad analog switch		analog	14	MM74HC4316
74x4351	1	8-channel analog multiplexer/demultiplexer with latch		analog	20	CD74HC4351
74x4352	2	dual 4-channel analog multiplexer/demultiplexer with latch		analog	20	CD74HC4352
74x4353	3	triple 2-channel analog multiplexer/demultiplexer with latch		analog	20	MC74HC4353
74x4374	1	8-bit dual-rank synchronizer		three-state	20	SN74AS4374
74x4503	1	controller for 64k/256k/1M dynamic RAM		three-state	52	SN74ACT4503
74x4510	1	BCD decade up/down counter			16	CD74HC4510
74x4511	1	BCD to 7-segment decoder			16	CD74HC4511
74x4514	1	4-to-16 line decoder/demultiplexer, input latches			24	CD74HC4514
74x4515	1	4-to-16 line decoder/demultiplexer with input latches; inverting			24	CD74HC4515
74x4516	1	4-bit binary up/down counter			16	CD74HC4516
74x4518	2	dual 4-bit synchronous decade counter			16	CD74HC4518
74x4520	2	dual 4-bit synchronous binary counter			16	CD74HC4520
74x4538	2	dual retriggerable precision monostable multivibrator			16	CD74HC4538
74x4543	1	BCD to 7-segment latch/decoder/driver for LCDs			16	CD74HC4543
74x4560	1	4-bit BCD adder			16	MM74HC4560
74x4724	1	8-bit addressable latch			16	SN74HC4724
74x4764	1	programmable dRAM controller			(100)	74ABT4764
74x4799	1	Timer for NiCd and NiMH chargers	Schmitt trigger	open-collector and three-state	16	74LV4799
74x4851	1	8-channel analog multiplexer/demultiplexer		analog	16	SN74HC4851
74x4852	2	dual 4-channel analog multiplexer/demultiplexer		analog	16	SN74HC4852
74x5074	2	dual positive edge-triggered D-type flip-flop (metastable immune)			14	74ABT5074
74x5245	1	octal bidirectional transceiver	Schmitt trigger	three-state	20	DM74ALS5245
74x5300	1	fiber optic LED driver		driver 120 mA	8	74F5300
74x5302	2	dual fiber optic LED / clock driver		driver 160 mA	14	74F5302
74x5400	1	11-bit line/memory driver, non-inverting		three-state, 25 Ω series resistor	28	SN74ABT5400
74x5401	1	11-bit line/memory driver, inverting		three-state, 25 Ω series resistor	28	SN74ABT5401
74x5402	1	12-bit line/memory driver, non-inverting		three-state, 25 Ω series resistor	28	SN74ABT5402
74x5403	1	12-bit line/memory driver, inverting		three-state, 25 Ω series resistor	28	SN74ABT5403
74x5555	1	programmable delay timer with oscillator			16	74HC5555
74x5620	1	octal bidirectional transceiver	Schmitt trigger	three-state	20	DM74ALS5620
=== 74x6000 and above === Part number	Units	Description	Input	Output	Pins	Datasheet
74x6000	1	logic-to-logic optocoupler, non-inverting			6	74OL6000
74x6001	1	logic-to-logic optocoupler, inverting			6	74OL6001
74x6010	1	logic-to-logic optocoupler, non-inverting		open-collector 15 V	6	74OL6010
74x6011	1	logic-to-logic optocoupler, inverting		open-collector 15 V	6	74OL6011
74x6300	1	programmable dynamic memory refresh timer			16	SN74ALS6300
74x6301	1	dynamic memory refresh controller, transparent and burst modes, for 16K, 64K, 256K, and 1M dRAM			52	SN74ALS6301
74x6302	1	dynamic memory refresh controller, transparent and burst modes, for 16K, 64K, 256K, and 1M dRAM			52	SN74ALS6302
74x6310	1	static column and page mode access detector for dRAM			20	SN74ALS6310A
74x6311	1	static column and page mode access detector for dRAM			20	SN74ALS6311A
74x6323	1	programmable ripple counter with oscillator		three-state	(8)	74HC6323A
74x6364	1	64-bit flow-through error detection and correction circuit		three-state	(207)	SN74AS6364
74x6800	1	10-bit FET bus switch with precharge			24	IDT74FST6800
74x6845	1	8-bit FET bus switch with precharge and extended voltage range			(20)	SN74CBT6845C
74x7001	4	quad 2-input AND gate	Schmitt trigger		14	SN74HC7001
74x7002	4	quad 2-input NOR gate	Schmitt trigger		14	SN74HC7002
74x7003	4	quad 2-input NAND gate	Schmitt trigger	open-collector	14	SN74HC7003
74x7006	6	two inverters, one 3-input NAND, one 4-input NAND, one 3-input NOR, one 4-input NOR			24	SN74HC7006
74x7007	6	hex buffer gate			14	TC74HCT7007AP
74x7008	6	two inverters, three 2-input NAND, three 2-input NOR			24	SN74HC7008
74x7014	6	hex buffer gate	Schmitt trigger		14	74HC7014
74x7022	1	4-stage ÷8 Johnson counter with power-up clear			14	SN74HC7022
74x7030	1	576-bit FIFO memory (64x9)		three-state	28	74HC7030
74x7032	4	quad 2-input OR gates	Schmitt trigger		14	SN74HC7032
74x7038	1	9-bit bus transceiver with latch		three-state	24	CD74HC7038
74x7046	1	phase-locked loop with voltage-controlled oscillator and lock detector			16	CD74HC7046A
74x7060	1	14-stage binary counter with oscillator	Schmitt trigger		20	CD74AC7060
74x7074	6	two inverters, one 2-input NAND, one 2-input NOR, two D-type flip-flops			24	SN74HC7074
74x7075	6	two inverters, two 2-input NAND, two D-type flip-flops			24	SN74HC7075
74x7076	6	two inverters, two 2-input NOR, two D-type flip-flops			24	SN74HC7076
74x7080	1	16-bit parity generator / checker			20	74HCT7080
74x7132	4	quad adjustable comparator with output latches	Schmitt trigger	three-state	14	74HCT7132
74x7200	1	2304-bit FIFO memory (256x9)			28	SN74ACT7200L
74x7201	1	4608-bit FIFO memory (512x9)			28	SN74ACT7201LA
74x7202	1	9216-bit FIFO memory (1024x9)			28	SN74ACT7202LA
74x7203	1	18432-bit FIFO memory (2048x9)			28	SN74ACT7203L
74ACT7204	1	36864-bit FIFO memory (4096x9)			28	SN74ACT7204L
74HCU7204	2	dual unbuffered inverters			(8)	SN74HCU7204
74x7205	1	73728-bit FIFO memory (8192x9)			28	SN74ACT7205L
74x7206	1	147456-bit FIFO memory (16384x9)			28	SN74ACT7206L
74x7240	1	octal bus buffer, inverting	Schmitt trigger	three-state	20	TC74HC7240AP
74x7241	1	octal bus buffer, non-inverting	Schmitt trigger	three-state	20	TC74HC7241AP
74x7244	1	octal bus buffer, non-inverting	Schmitt trigger	three-state	20	TC74HC7244AP
74x7245	1	octal bus transceiver, non-inverting	Schmitt trigger	three-state	20	M74HC7245
74x7266	4	quad 2-input XNOR gate			14	SN74HC7266
74x7273	8	octal positive edge-triggered D-type flip-flop with reset		open-collector	20	74HCT7273
74x7292	1	programmable divider/timer			16	TC74HC7292AP
74x7294	1	programmable divider/timer			16	M74HC7294
74x7340	1	8-bit bus driver with bidirectional registers		three-state	24	SN74HC7340
74x7403	1	256-bit FIFO memory (64x4)		three-state	16	74HC7403
74x7404	1	320-bit FIFO memory (64x5)		three-state	18	74HC7404
74x7540	8	octal buffer/line driver, inverting	Schmitt trigger	three-state	20	74HC7540
74x7541	8	octal buffer/line driver, non-inverting	Schmitt trigger	three-state	20	74HC7541
74x7597	1	8-bit shift register with input latches			16	74HC7597
74x7623	1	octal bus transceiver, non-inverting		three-state and open-drain	20	CD74AC7623
74x7640	1	octal bus transceiver, inverting	Schmitt trigger	three-state	20	M74HC7640
74x7643	1	octal bus transceiver, non-inverting/inverting	Schmitt trigger	three-state	20	M74HC7643
74x7645	1	octal bus transceiver, non-inverting	Schmitt trigger	three-state	20	M74HC7645
74x7731	4	quad 64-bit static shift register			16	74HC7731
74x7793	1	8-bit noninverting transparent latch with readback		three-state	20	MC74HC7793
74x7801	1	18432-bit FIFO memory (1024x18), clocked		three-state	(68)	SN74ACT7801
74x7802	1	18432-bit FIFO memory (1024x18)		three-state	(68)	SN74ACT7802
74x7803	1	9216-bit FIFO memory (512x18), clocked		three-state	(56)	SN74ACT7803
74x7804	1	9216-bit FIFO memory (512x18)		three-state	(56)	SN74ACT7804
74x7805	1	4608-bit FIFO memory (256x18), clocked		three-state	(56)	SN74ACT7805
74x7806	1	4608-bit FIFO memory (256x18)		three-state	(56)	SN74ACT7806
74x7807	1	18432-bit FIFO memory (2048x9), clocked		three-state	(44)	SN74ACT7807
74x7808	1	18432-bit FIFO memory (2048x9)		three-state	(44)	SN74ACT7808
74x7811	1	18432-bit FIFO memory (1024x18), clocked		three-state	(68)	SN74ACT7811
74x7813	1	1152-bit FIFO memory (64x18), clocked		three-state	(56)	SN74ACT7813
74x7814	1	1152-bit FIFO memory (64x18)		three-state	(56)	SN74ACT7814
74x7815	1	4608-bit bidirectional FIFO memory(2x64x36)		three-state	(120)	SN74ABT7815
74x7816	1	4608-bit bidirectional FIFO memory(2x64x36)		three-state	(120)	SN74ABT7816
74x7817	1	2304-bit FIFO memory(64x36)		three-state	(120)	SN74ABT7817
74x7818	1	2304-bit FIFO memory(64x36)		three-state	(120)	SN74ABT7818
74x7819	1	18432-bit bidirectional FIFO memory (2x512x18), clocked		three-state	(80)	SN74ABT7819
74x7820	1	18432-bit bidirectional FIFO memory (2x512x18)		three-state	(80)	SN74ABT7820
74x7821	1	32768-bit bidirectional FIFO memory (2x512x32)		three-state	(120)	SN74ACT7821
74x7822	1	32768-bit bidirectional FIFO memory (2x512x32), clocked		three-state	(120)	SN74ACT7822
74x7823	1	36864-bit FIFO memory (1024x36), clocked		three-state	(120)	SN74ACT7823
74x7881	1	18432-bit FIFO memory (1024x18), clocked		three-state	(68)	SN74ACT7881
74x7882	1	36864-bit FIFO memory (2048x18), clocked		three-state	(68)	SN74ACT7882
74x7884	1	73728-bit FIFO memory (4096x18), clocked		three-state	(68)	SN74ACT7884
74x8003	2	dual 2-input NAND gate			8	SN74ALS8003
74x8151	1	10-bit inverting/non-inverting buffer	Schmitt trigger	three-state	24	SN74LV8151
74x8153	1	8-bit serial-to-parallel interface		three-state or open-collector	20	SN74LV8153
74x8154	2	dual 16-bit counters with output registers		three-state	20	SN74LV8154
74x8161	1	8-bit synchronous binary counter			24	SN74ALS8161
74x8240	1	octal inverting buffer with JTAG port		three-state	24	SN74BCT8240A
74x8244	1	octal non-inverting buffer with JTAG port		three-state	24	SN74BCT8244A
74x8245	1	octal bus transceiver with JTAG port		three-state	24	SN74ABT8245
74x8373	1	octal D-type latch with JTAG port		three-state	24	SN74BCT8373A
74x8374	1	octal D-type edge-triggered flip-flop with JTAG port		three-state	24	SN74BCT8374A
74x8400	1	expandable error checker / corrector		three-state	48	SN74ALS8400
74AHC8541	1	8-bit buffer, selectable inverting/non-inverting	Schmitt trigger	three-state	20	SN74AHC8541
74AC8541, 74ACT8541	1	8-bit buffer, dual enable	Schmitt trigger	three-state	20	SN74AC8541
74x8543	1	octal registered bus transceiver with JTAG port		three-state	28	SN74ABT8543
74x8646	1	octal bus transceiver and register with JTAG port		three-state	28	SN74ABT8646
74x8652	1	octal bus transceiver and register with JTAG port		three-state	28	SN74ABT8652
74x8818	1	16-bit microprogram sequencer, cascadable		three-state	(84)	SN74ACT8818
74x8832	1	32-bit registered ALU		three-state	(208)	SN74ACT8832
74x8834	1	40-bit register file		three-state	(156)	SN74AS8834
74x8835	1	16-bit microprogram sequencer, cascadable		three-state	(156)	SN74AS8835
74x8836	1	32x32-bit multiplier/accumulator		three-state	(156)	SN74ACT8836
74x8837	1	64-bit floating point unit		three-state	(208)	SN74ACT8837
74x8838	1	64-bit barrel shifter		three-state	(84)	SN74AS8838
74x8839	1	32-bit shuffle/exchange network		three-state	(85)	SN74AS8839
74x8840	1	digital crossbar switch		three-state	(156)	SN74AS8840
74x8841	1	digital crossbar switch		three-state	(156)	SN74ACT8841
74x8847	1	64-bit floating point and integer unit		three-state	(208)	SN74ACT8847
74x8867	1	32-bit vector processor unit		three-state	(208)	SN74ACT8867
74x8952	1	octal registered bus transceiver with JTAG port		three-state	28	SN74ABT8952
74x8960	1	8-bit bidirectional latched FutureBus transceiver, inverting		three-state and open-collector	28	74F8960
74x8961	1	8-bit bidirectional latched FutureBus transceiver, non-inverting		three-state and open-collector	28	74F8961
74x8962	1	9-bit bidirectional latched FutureBus transceiver, inverting		three-state and open-collector	(44)	74F8962
74x8963	1	9-bit bidirectional latched FutureBus transceiver, non-inverting		three-state and open-collector	(44)	74F8963
74x8965	1	9-bit bidirectional latched FutureBus transceiver, latch select		three-state and open-collector	(44)	74F8965
74x8966	1	9-bit bidirectional latched FutureBus transceiver, idle arbitration request / output		three-state and open-collector	(44)	74F8966
74x8980	1	JTAG test access port master with 8-bit host interface		three-state	24	SN74LVT8980
74x8986	1	linkable, multidrop-addressable JTAG transceiver		three-state	(64)	SN74LVT8986
74x8990	1	JTAG test access port master with 16-bit host interface		three-state	(44)	SN74ACT8990
74x8994	1	JTAG scan-controlled logic/signature analyzer			(28)	SN74ACT8994
74x8996	1	multidrop-addressable JTAG transceiver			24	SN74ABT8996
74x8997	1	scan-controlled JTAG concatenator		three-state	28	SN74ACT8997
74x8999	1	scan-controlled JTAG multiplexer		three-state	28	SN74ACT8999
74x9000	1	programmable timer with oscillator			20	MC74HC9000
74x9014	9	nine-wide buffer/line driver, inverting	Schmitt trigger		20	74HC9014
74x9015	9	nine-wide buffer/line driver, non-inverting	Schmitt trigger		20	74HC9015
74x9034	9	nine-wide buffer, inverting			20	MC74HC9034
74x9035	9	nine-wide buffer, noninverting			20	MC74HC9035
74x9046	1	PLL with band gap controlled VCO			16	74HCT9046
74x9114	9	nine-wide inverter	Schmitt trigger	open-collector	20	74HC9114
74x9115	9	nine-wide buffer	Schmitt trigger	open-collector	20	74HC9115
74x9134	9	nine-wide buffer, inverting		open-collector	20	MC74HC9134
74x9135	9	nine-wide buffer, noninverting		open-collector	20	MC74HC9135
74x9164	1	8-bit shift register (serial in/out, parallel in/out)	Schmitt trigger	three-state	(16)	TC74VHC9164
74x9240	1	9-bit buffer / line driver, inverting		three-state	24	74FR9240
74x9244	1	9-bit buffer / line driver, non-inverting		three-state	24	74FR9244
74x9245	1	9-bit bidirectional transceiver, non-inverting		three-state	24	74FR9245
74x9323	1	programmable ripple counter with oscillator		three-state	(8)	74HC9323A
74x9510	1	16×16-bit multiplier/accumulator (compatible to Am29510 and TDC1010)		three-state	(68)	74HC9510
74x9541	1	8-bit buffer / line driver, inverting / non-inverting	Schmitt trigger	three-state	(20)	74AHC9541A
74x9595	1	8-bit shift register with latch (serial in, parallel out)	Schmitt trigger		(16)	TC74VHC9595
74x40102	1	presettable synchronous 2-decade BCD down counter			16	CD74HC40102
74x40103	1	presettable 8-bit synchronous down counter			16	CD74HC40103
74x40104	4	4-bit bidirectional universal shift register		three-state	16	CD74HC40104
74x40105	1	64-bit FIFO memory (16x4)		three-state	16	CD74HC40105
Part number	Units	Description	Input	Output	Pins	Datasheet

== Widebus devices ==
The widebus range in the 74xxx series includes higher-numbered parts like the 7416xxx and others, designed for extended functionality beyond standard chips. These components often feature 16-bit or wider data handling, serving as direct expansions of existing 8-bit designs (e.g., 74373 to 7416373) or introducing entirely new capabilities. They utilize higher pin counts to support larger data buses, advanced operations, and scalable digital logic solutions for more complex circuit requirements.

Part number	Description	Input	Output	Pins	Datasheet
74x1612	18-bit LVTTL-to-GTLP universal bus transceiver		three-state, open-collector	64	GTLPH
74x1616	17-bit LVTTL-to-GTLP adjustable edge rate universal bus transceiver		three-state, open-collector	64	GTLPH
74x1627	18-bit LVTTL-to-GTLP bus transceiver		three-state, open-collector	64	GTLPH
74x1645	16-bit LVTTL-to-GTLP adjustable edge rate bus transceiver		three-state, open-collector	56	GTLPH
74x1650	18-bit TTL/BTL universal storage transceiver		three-state, open-collector	(100)	FB
74x1651	17-bit TTL/BTL universal storage transceiver		three-state, open-collector	(100)	FB
74x1653	17-bit LVTTL/BTL universal storage transceiver		three-state, open-collector	(100)	FB
74x1655	16-bit LVTTL-to-GTLP adjustable edge rate universal bus transceiver		three-state, open-collector	64	GTL
74x16209	18-bit FET bus exchange switches			48	CBT
74x16210	20-bit FET bus switch			48	CBT
74x16211	24-bit FET bus switch			56	CBT
74x16212	24-bit FET bus exchange switches			56	CBT
74x16213	24-bit FET bus exchange switches			56	CBT
74x16214	12-bit 1-of-3 FET multiplexer/demultiplexer			56	CBT
74x16222	22-bit voltage clamp			48	TVC
74x16232	synchronous 16-bit 1-of-2 FET multiplexer/demultiplexer			56	CBT
74x16233	16-bit 1-of-2 FET multiplexer/demultiplexer			56	CBT
74x16240	16-bit inverting buffer/driver with grouped 4-bit output enables (all active-low)		three-state	48	ABT
74x16241	16-bit non-inverting buffer/driver with grouped 4-bit output enables (1 and 4 active-low)		three-state	48	ABT
74x16244	16-bit non-inverting buffer/driver with grouped 4-bit output enables (all active-low)		three-state	48	ABT
74x16245	16-bit bus transceiver		three-state	48	ABT
74x16246	11-bit incident wave switching bus transceiver		three-state, open-collector	48	ABTE
74x16260	12-bit to 24-bit multiplexed D-type latches		three-state	56	ABT
74x16269	12-bit to 24-bit registered bus exchanger		three-state	56	ALVCH
74x16270	12-bit to 24-bit registered bus exchanger		three-state	56	ALVCH
74x16271	12-bit to 24-bit multiplexed bus exchanger		three-state	56	ALVCH
74x16282	18-bit to 36-bit registered bus exchanger		three-state	80	ALVCH
74x16292	12-bit 1-of-2 FET multiplexer/demultiplexer			56	CBT
74x16334	16-bit universal bus driver		three-state	48	ALVC
74x16344	1-bit to 4-bit address driver		three-state	56	ALVCH
74x16373	16-bit transparent D-type latches		three-state	48	ABT
74x16374	16-bit edge-triggered D-type flip-flops		three-state	48	ABT
74x16377	16-bit edge-triggered D-type flip-flops			48	ABT
74x16390	16-bit to 32-bit FET multiplexer/demultiplexer bus switch			56	CBT
74x16409	9-bit 4-port universal bus exchanger		three-state	56	ALVCH
74x16460	4-to-1 multiplexed/demultiplexed registered transceiver		three-state	56	ABT
74x16470	16-bit registered transceiver		three-state	56	ABT
74x16500	18-bit universal bus transceiver (registered, active low clock)		three-state	56	ABT
74x16501	18-bit universal bus transceiver (registered, active high clock)		three-state	56	ABT
74x16524	18-bit registered bus transceiver		three-state	56	ALVCH
74x16525	18-bit registered bus transceiver		three-state	56	ALVCH
74x16540	16-bit inverting buffer/driver with grouped 8-bit output enables (active-low)		three-state	48	ABT
74x16541	16-bit non-inverting buffer/driver with grouped 8-bit output enables (active-low)		three-state	48	ABT
74x16543	16-bit registered transceiver		three-state	56	ABT
74x16600	18-bit universal bus transceiver (registered, active low clock)		three-state	56	ABT
74x16601	18-bit universal bus transceiver (registered, active high clock)		three-state	56	ABT
74x16612	18-bit LVTTL-to-GTL+ universal bus transceiver		three-state, open-collector	56	GTL
74x16616	17-bit LVTTL-to-GTL+ universal bus transceiver		three-state, open-collector	56	GTL
74x16620	16-bit bus transceiver		three-state	48	AC
74x16622	18-bit LVTTL-to-GTL+ bus transceiver		three-state, open-collector	64	GTL
74x16623	16-bit bus transceiver		three-state	48	ABT
74x16640	16-bit bus transceiver		three-state	48	ABT
74x16646	16-bit bus transceiver and registers		three-state	56	ABT
74x16648	16-bit bus transceiver and registers		three-state	56	ABT
74x16651	16-bit bus transceiver and registers		three-state	56	ABT
74x16652	16-bit bus transceiver and registers		three-state	56	ABT
74x16657	16-bit bus transceiver with parity generators/checkers		three-state	56	ABT
74x16721	3.3-V 20-bit flip-flop		three-state	56	ALVCH
74x16722	22-bit flip-flop		three-state	64	AVC
74x16800	20-bit FET bus switch			48	CBT
74x16811	24-bit FET bus switch			56	CBT
74x16820	3.3-V 10-bit flip-flop with dual outputs		three-state	56	ALVCH
74x16821	20-bit bus interface flip-flops		three-state	56	ABT
74x16823	18-bit bus interface flip-flops		three-state	56	ABT
74x16825	18-bit non-inverting bus buffer/driver		three-state	56	ABT
74x16826	18-bit inverting bus buffer/driver		three-state	56	ABT
74x16827	20-bit non-inverting bus buffer/driver		three-state	56	ABT
74x16828	20-bit inverting bus buffer/driver		three-state	56	ABT
74x16831	1-to-4 address register/driver		three-state	80	ALVCH
74x16832	1-to-4 address register/driver		three-state	64	ALVCH
74x16833	dual 8-bit to 9-bit parity bus transceivers		three-state, open-collector	56	ABT
74x16834	18-bit universal bus driver		three-state	56	AVC
74x16835	18-bit universal bus driver		three-state	56	ALVC
74x16841	20-bit bus interface D-type latches		three-state	56	ABT
74x16843	18-bit bus interface D-type latches		three-state	56	ABT
74x16853	dual 8-bit to 9-bit parity bus transceiver		three-state	56	ABT
74x16857	14-bit registered buffer			48	SSTVF
74x16859	13-bit to 26-bit registered buffer			64	SSTVF
74x16861	20-bit FET bus switch			56	CBT
74x16863	18-bit bus transceiver		three-state	56	ABT
74x16901	18-bit universal bus transceiver with parity generators/checkers			64	ALVCH
74x16903	3.3-V 12-bit universal bus driver with parity checker		three-state	56	ALVCH
74x16912	18-bit LVTTL-to-GTLP universal bus transceiver		three-state, open-collector	56	GTLPH
74x16916	17-bit LVTTL-to-GTLP universal bus transceiver		three-state, open-collector	56	GTLPH
74x16923	18-bit LVTTL-to-GTLP universal bus transceiver		three-state, open-collector	64	GTL
74x16945	16-bit LVTTL-to-GTLP bus transceiver		three-state, open-collector	48	GTLPH
74x16952	16-bit registered transceiver		three-state	56	ABT
74x16973	8-bit bus transceiver and transparent D-type latch			48	ALVCH
74x161284	19-bit bus interface		open-drain with internal 1.4-kΩ pull up resistors	48	LVC
74x162240	3.3-V ABT 16-bit buffer/driver, inverting outputs		three-state	48	LVTH
74x162241	3.3-V ABT 16-bit buffer/driver		three-state	48	LVTH
74x162244	16-bit buffer/driver		three-state	48	ALVCH
74x162245	16-bit bus transceiver		three-state	48	LVCR
74x162260	12-bit to 24-bit multiplexed D-type latch		three-state	56	ALVCH
74x162268	12-bit to 24-bit registered bus exchanger		three-state	56	ALVCH
74x162280	16-bit to 32-bit registered bus exchanger with byte masks		three-state	80	ALVCHG
74x162282	18-bit to 36-bit registered bus exchanger		three-state	80	ALVCHG
74x162292	12-bit 1-of-2 FET multiplexer/demultiplexer		internal 500-Ω pull down resistors	56	CBT
74x162334	16-bit universal bus driver		three-state	48	ALVC
74x162344	1-bit to 4-bit address driver		three-state	56	ALVCH
74x162373	3.3-V ABT 16-bit transparent D-type latch		three-state	48	LVTH
74x162374	3.3-V ABT 16-bit edge triggered D-type flip-flop		three-state	48	LVTH
74x162460	4-to-1 multiplexed/demultiplexed registered transceiver		three-state	56	ABTH
74x162500	18-bit universal bus transceiver		three-state	56	ABT
74x162501	18-bit registered transceiver		three-state	56	FCT
74x162525	18-bit registered bus transceiver		three-state	56	ALVCH
74x162541	3.3-V ABT 16-bit buffers/drivers		three-state	48	LVTH
74x162543	16-bit latched transceiver		three-state	56	FCT
74x162601	18-bit universal bus transceiver		three-state	56	ALVCH
74x162646	16-bit registered transceiver		three-state	56	FCT
74x162652	16-bit registered transceiver		three-state	56	FCT
74x162721	3.3-V 20-bit flip-flop		three-state	56	ALVCH
74x162820	3.3-V 10-bit flip-flop		three-state	56	ALVCH
74x162821	20-bit bus interface flip-flops		three-state	56	ALVT
74x162823	18-bit bus interface flip-flops		three-state	56	ABT
74x162825	18-bit buffer/driver		three-state	56	ABT
74x162827	20-bit buffer/driver		three-state	56	ABT
74x162830	1-bit to 2-bit address driver		three-state	80	ALVCH
74x162831	1-bit to 4-bit address register/driver		three-state	80	ALVCH
74x162832	1-bit to 4-bit address register/driver		three-state	64	ALVCH
74x162834	3.3-V CMOS 18-bit universal bus driver		three-state	56	ALVCF
74x162835	18-bit universal bus driver		three-state	56	ALVC
74x162836	20-bit universal bus driver		three-state	56	ALVCH
74x162841	20-bit bus interface D-type latch		three-state	56	ALVCH
74x164245	16-bit dual supply bus transceiver		three-state	48	AVCA
Part number	Description	Input	Output	Pins	Datasheet
74x18245	scan test devices with 18-bit bus transceivers		three-state	56	ABT
74x18502	scan test devices with 18-bit universal bus transceivers		three-state	(64)	ABTH
74x18504	scan test devices with 20-bit universal bus transceivers		three-state	(64)	LVTH
74x18512	scan test devices with 18-bit universal bus transceivers		three-state	64	LVTH
74x18640	scan test devices with 18-bit inverting bus transceivers		three-state	56	ABT
74x18646	scan test devices with 18-bit transceivers and registers		three-state	(64)	LVTH
74x18652	scan test devices with 18-bit transceivers and registers		three-state	(64)	LVTH
74x182502	scan test devices with 18-bit universal bus transceivers		three-state	(64)	ABTH
74x182504	scan test devices with 20-bit universal bus transceivers		three-state	(64)	LVTH
74x182512	scan test devices with 18-bit universal bus transceivers		three-state	64	LVTH
74x182646	scan test devices with 18-bit transceivers and registers		three-state	(64)	LVTH
74x182652	scan test devices with 18-bit transceivers and registers		three-state	(64)	LVTH
Part number	Description	Input	Output	Pins	Datasheet
74x20245	20-bit dual supply bus transceiver		three-state	56	AVC
Part number	Description	Input	Output	Pins	Datasheet
74x22033	8-bit LVTTL-to-GTLP adjustable edge rate registered transceiver		three-state, open-collector	48	GTLP
74x22501	8-bit universal bus transceiver and two 1-bit bus transceivers		three-state	48	VMEH
Part number	Description	Input	Output	Pins	Datasheet
74x25244	25-Ω octal buffer/driver		three-state	24	BCT
74x25245	25-Ω octal bus transceiver		three-state	24	BCT
74x25642	25-Ω octal bus transceiver			24	ABT
Part number	Description	Input	Output	Pins	Datasheet
74x29821	10-bit bus interface flip-flops		three-state	24	ALS
74x29825	8-bit bus interface flip-flops		three-state	24	BCT
74x29827	10-bit bus buffer/driver		three-state	24	ALS
74x29828	10-bit bus buffer/driver		three-state	24	BCT
74x29841	10-bit bus interface D-type latches		three-state	24	BCT
74x29843	9-bit bus interface D-type latches		three-state	24	BCT
74x29854	8-bit to 9-bit parity bus transceiver			24	BCT
74x29863	9-bit bus transceiver		three-state	24	BCT
74x29864	9-bit bus transceiver		three-state	24	BCT
Part number	Description	Input	Output	Pins	Datasheet
74x32240	32-bit bus buffer/driver		three-state	(96)	LVT
74x32244	32-bit bus buffer/driver		three-state	(96)	LVT
74x32245	36-bit bus transceiver		three-state	(100)	ABTH
74x32316	16-bit tri-port universal bus exchangers			(80)	ABTH
74x32318	18-bit tri-port universal bus exchangers			(80)	ABTH
74x32373	32-bit D-type latches		three-state	(96)	LVCH
74x32374	32-bit D-type flip-flops		three-state	(96)	LVCH
74x32501	36-bit universal bus transceiver		three-state	(100)	ABTH
74x32543	36-bit registered bus transceiver		three-state	(100)	ABTH
74x32973	16-bit bus transceiver and transparent D-type latch			(96)	LVCH
74x322244	32-bit buffer/driver		three-state	(96)	LVCH
74x322374	32-bit D-type flip-flops		three-state	(96)	LVTH
74x324245	32-bit dual supply bus transceiver		three-state	(120)	AVCB

== Smaller footprints ==
As board designs have migrated away from large amounts of logic chips, so has the need for many of the same gate in one package. Since about 1996, there has been an ongoing trend towards one / two / three logic gates per chip. Now logic can be placed where it is physically needed on a board, instead of running long signal traces to a full-size logic chip that has many of the same gate.

All chips in the following sections are available 5- to 10-pin surface-mount packages. The right digits, after the 1G/2G/3G, typically has the same functional features as older legacy chips, except for the multifunctional chips and 4-digit chip numbers, which are unique to these newer families. The "x" in the part number is a place holder for the logic family name. For example, 74x1G14 in "LVC" logic family would be "74LVC1G14". The previously stated prefixes of "SN-" and "MC-" are used to denote manufacturers, Texas Instruments and ON Semiconductor respectively.

Some of the manufacturers that make these smaller IC chips are: Diodes Incorporated, Nexperia (NXP Semiconductors), ON Semiconductor (Fairchild Semiconductor), Texas Instruments (National Semiconductor), Toshiba.

The logic families available in small footprints are: AHC, AHCT, AUC, AUP, AXP, HC, HCT, LVC, VHC, NC7S, NC7ST, NC7SU, NC7SV. The LVC family is very popular in small footprints because it supports the most common logic voltages of 1.8 V, 3.3 V, 5 V, its inputs are 5 V tolerant when the device is powered at a lower voltage, and an output drive of 24 mA. Gates that are commonly available across most small footprint families are 00, 02, 04, 08, 14, 32, 86, 125, 126.

Chips in this section typically contain the number of units noted by the number immediately before the 'G' in their prefix (e.g. 2G = 2 gates).

Part number	Units	Description	Input	Output	Pins	Datasheet
74x1G00	1	single 2-input NAND gate			5	LVC
74x1G02	1	single 2-input NOR gate			5	LVC
74x1G04	1	single inverter gate			5	LVC
74x1GU04	1	single inverter gate		unbuffered	5	LVC
74x1GX04	1	single crystal oscillator driver			6	LVC
74x1G06	1	single inverter gate		open-drain	5	LVC
74x1G07	1	single buffer gate		open-drain	5	LVC
74x1G08	1	single 2-input AND gate			5	LVC
74x1G09	1	single 2-input AND gate		open-drain	5	AUP
74x1G10	1	single 3-input NAND gate			6	LVC
74x1G11	1	single 3-input AND gate			6	LVC
74x1G14	1	single inverter gate	schmitt-trigger		5	LVC
74x1G16	1	single inverter gate	schmitt-trigger	open-drain	5	LVC
74x1G17	1	single buffer gate	schmitt-trigger		5	LVC
74x1G18	1	single 1-of-2 demultiplexer		three-state	6	LVC
74x1G19	1	single 1-to-2 line decoder, active-low outputs			6	LVC
74x1G27	1	single 3-input NOR gate			6	LVC
74x1G29	1	single 2-to-3 line decoder, active-low outputs			8	LVC
74x1G32	1	single 2-input OR gate			5	LVC
74x1G34	1	single buffer gate			5	LVC
74x1G38	1	single 2-input NAND gate		open-drain	5	LVC
74x1G57	1	single configurable 7-function gate	schmitt-trigger		6	LVC
74x1G58	1	single configurable 7-function gate	schmitt-trigger		6	LVC
74x1G66	1	single SPST analog switch	analog	analog	5	LVC
74x1G74	1	single positive-edge D flip-flop, asynchronous preset & clear, Q & /Q outputs			8	LVC
74x1G79	1	single positive-edge D flip-flop, Q output			5	LVC
74x1G80	1	single positive-edge D flip-flop, /Q output			5	LVC
74x1G86	1	single 2-input XOR gate (a.k.a. 2-bit even-parity generator)			5	LVC
74x1G97	1	single configurable 7-function gate	schmitt-trigger		6	LVC
74x1G98	1	single configurable 7-function gate	schmitt-trigger		6	LVC
74x1G99	1	single configurable 15-function gate, active-low enable	schmitt-trigger	three-state	8	LVC
74x1G123	1	single retriggerable monostable multivibrator	schmitt-trigger		8	LVC
74x1G125	1	single bus buffer gate, active-low enable		three-state	5	LVC
74x1G126	1	single bus buffer gate, active-high enable		three-state	5	LVC
74x1G132	1	single 2-input NAND gate	schmitt-trigger		5	LVC
74x1G139	1	single 2-to-4 line decoder, active-low outputs			8	LVC
74x1G157	1	single 2-to-1 data selector/multiplexer	schmitt-trigger		6	LVC
74x1G158	1	single 2-input multiplexer, active-low outputs	schmitt-trigger		6	AUP
74x1G175	1	single positive-edge D flip-flop, asynchronous clear, Q output			6	LVC
74x1G240	1	single bus buffer gate, active-low enable		three-state	5	LVC
74x1G332	1	single 3-input OR gate			6	LVC
74x1G373	1	single D-type transparent latch, Q output, active-low output enable		three-state	6	LVC
74x1G374	1	single positive-edge D flip-flop, Q output, active-low output enable		three-state	6	LVC
74x1G384	1	single FET bus switch		three-state	5	CBT
74x1G386	1	single 3-input XOR gate (a.k.a. 3-bit even-parity generator)			6	LVC
74x1G0832	1	single 3-input AND-OR combo gate (2-input AND into 2-input OR)	schmitt-trigger		6	LVC
74x1G3157	1	single SPDT analog switch	analog	analog	6	LVC
74x1G3208	1	single 3-input OR-AND combo gate (2-input OR into 2-input AND)	schmitt-trigger		6	LVC
Part number		Description	Input	Output	Pins	Datasheet
74x2G00	2	dual 2-input NAND gate			8	LVC
74x2G02	2	dual 2-input NOR gate			8	LVC
74x2G04	2	dual inverter gate			6	LVC
74x2GU04	2	dual inverter gate		unbuffered	6	LVC
74x2G06	2	dual inverter gate		open-drain	6	LVC
74x2G07	2	dual buffer gate		open-drain	6	LVC
74x2G08	2	dual 2-input AND gate			8	LVC
74x2G14	2	dual inverter gate	schmitt-trigger		6	LVC
74x2G17	2	dual buffer gate	schmitt-trigger		6	LVC
74x2G32	2	dual 2-input OR gate			8	LVC
74x2G34	2	dual buffer gate			6	LVC
74x2G38	2	dual 2-input NAND gate		open-drain	8	LVC
74x2G53	1	single SPDT analog switch, 2:1 analog multiplexer/demultiplexer	analog	analog	8	LVC
74x2G57	2	dual configurable 7-function gate	schmitt-trigger		10	AUP
74x2G58	2	dual configurable 7-function gate	schmitt-trigger		10	AUP
74x2G66	2	dual SPST analog switch	analog	analog	8	LVC
74x2G74	1	single positive-edge D flip-flop, asynchronous preset & clear, Q & /Q outputs			8	LVC
74x2G79	2	dual positive-edge D flip-flop, Q output			8	LVC
74x2G80	2	dual positive-edge D flip-flop, /Q output			8	LVC
74x2G86	2	dual 2-input XOR gate (a.k.a. 2-bit even-parity generator)			8	LVC
74x2G97	2	dual configurable 7-function gate	schmitt-trigger		10	AUP
74x2G98	2	dual configurable 7-function gate	schmitt-trigger		10	AUP
74x2G125	2	dual bus buffer, active-low enable		three-state	8	LVC
74x2G126	2	dual bus buffer, active-high enable		three-state	8	LVC
74x2G132	2	dual 2-input NAND gate	schmitt-trigger		8	LVC
74x2G157	1	single 2-to-1 data selector/multiplexer			8	LVC
74x2G240	2	dual inverting bus buffer gate, active-low enable		three-state	8	LVC
74x2G241	2	dual bus buffer gate, active-low and active-high enables		three-state	8	LVC
74x2G0604	2	dual inverter gate (one open-drain)		open-drain	6	AUP
74x2G3404	2	single buffer and single inverter			6	AUP
74x2G3407	2	dual buffer gate (one open-drain)		open-drain	6	AUP
Part number	Units	Description	Input	Output	Pins	Datasheet
74x3G04	3	triple inverter gate			8	LVC
74x3GU04	3	triple inverter gate		unbuffered	8	LVC
74x3G06	3	triple inverter gate		open-drain	8	LVC
74x3G07	3	triple buffer gate		open-drain	8	LVC
74x3G14	3	triple inverter gate	schmitt-trigger		8	LVC
74x3G16	3	triple buffer gate			8	LVC
74x3G17	3	triple buffer gate	schmitt-trigger		8	LVC
74x3G34	3	triple buffer gate			8	LVC
74x3G57	3	triple configurable 7-function gate	schmitt-trigger		14	LVC
74x3G58	3	triple configurable 7-function gate	schmitt-trigger		14	LVC
74x3G97	3	triple configurable 7-function gate	schmitt-trigger		14	LVC
74x3G98	3	triple configurable 7-function gate	schmitt-trigger		14	LVC
74x3G0434	3	dual inverter and single buffer			8	AUP
74x3G3404	3	dual buffer and single inverter			8	AUP

=== Voltage translation ===
All chips in this section have two power-supply pins to translate unidirectional logic signals between two different logic voltages. For example, the 74LVC1T family allows any voltage from 1.65V to 5.5V for the Vcca power pin, then any other voltage from 1.65V to 5.5V for the Vccb power pin. The logic families that support dual-supply voltage translation are AVC, AVCH, AXC, AXCH, AXP, LVC, where the "H" in AVCH and AXCH means "bus hold" feature.

Part number	Units	Description	Pins	Datasheet
74x1T00	1	single-supply 2-input NAND gate	5	AUPLV
74x1T02	1	single-supply 2-input NOR gate	5	AUPLV
74x1T04	1	single-supply inverter	5	AUPLV
74x1T08	1	single-supply 2-input AND gate	5	AUPLV
74x1T14	1	single-supply schmitt-trigger inverter	5	AUP
74x1T17	1	single-supply schmitt-trigger buffer	5	AUP
74x1T32	1	single-supply 2-input OR gate	5	AUPLV
74x1T34	1	dual-supply unidirectional buffer/driver	5	AUPLV
74x1T45	1	dual-supply 1-bit bus transceiver	6	AXCAXPLVC
74x1T50	1	single-supply schmitt-trigger buffer	5	AUP
74x1T57	1	single-supply configurable 9-function gate	6	AUP
74x1T58	1	single-supply configurable 9-function gate	6	AUP
74x1T86	1	single-supply 2-input XOR gate	5	AUPLV
74x1T87	1	single-supply 2-input XNOR gate	5	AUP
74x1T97	1	single-supply configurable 9-function gate	6	AUP
74x1T98	1	single-supply configurable 9-function gate	6	AUP
74x1T125	1	single-supply single buffer/driver with 3-state output	5	LV
74x1T126	1	single-supply single buffer/driver with 3-state output	5	LV
74x1T157	1	single-supply 2-input schmitt-trigger multiplexer (non-inverted)	6	AUP
74x1T158	1	single-supply 2-input schmitt-trigger multiplexer (inverted)	6	AUP
74x2T45	2	dual-supply 2-bit bus transceiver	8	AXCAXPLVC
74x4T234	4	dual-supply 4-bit bus transceiver	16	AVC
74x4T245	4	dual-supply 4-bit bus transceiver	16	AXCAXP
74x4T774	4	dual-supply 4-bit bus transceiver	16	AXC
74x8T245	8	dual-supply 8-bit bus transceiver	24	AXCAXPLVC
74x16T245	16	dual-supply 16-bit bus transceiver	48	LVC
74x20T245	20	dual-supply 20-bit bus transceiver	56	AVC
74x24T245	24	dual-supply 24-bit bus transceiver	(83)	AVC
74x32T245	32	dual-supply 32-bit bus transceiver	(120)	AVC

Chips in the above table support the following voltage ranges on either power supply pin:

- AXC = 0.65 to 3.6 V. Only available from Texas Instruments.
- AXP = 0.9 to 5.5 V. Only available from Nexperia.
- LVC = 1.65 to 5.5 V. Available from Diodes Inc, Nexperia, Texas Instruments.

== See also ==
- 4000-series integrated circuits
- List of 4000-series integrated circuits
- Push–pull output, Open-collector output, Three-state output
- Schmitt trigger input
- Logic gate, Logic family
- Programmable logic device
- Pin compatibility
