= Gunning transceiver logic =

Gunning transceiver logic (GTL) is a type of logic signaling used to drive electronic backplane buses. It has a voltage swing between 0.4 volts and 1.2 volts — much lower than that used in TTL and CMOS logic — and symmetrical parallel resistive termination. The maximum signaling frequency is specified to be 100 MHz, although some applications use higher frequencies. GTL is defined by JEDEC standard JESD 8-3 (1993) and was invented by William Gunning while working for Xerox at the Palo Alto Research Center.

All Intel front-side buses use GTL. As of 2008, GTL in these FSBs has a maximum frequency of 1.6 GHz. The front-side bus of the Intel Pentium Pro, Pentium II and Pentium III microprocessors uses GTL+ (or GTLP) developed by Fairchild Semiconductor, an upgraded version of GTL which has defined slew rates and higher voltage levels. AGTL+ stands for either assisted Gunning transceiver logic or advanced Gunning transceiver logic. These are GTL signaling derivatives used by Intel microprocessors.
