= Negative logic =

Negative logic may refer to:

- Negative logic, a representation of logic level
- Negation

== See also ==
- Logic family
