= Shift resistor =

Shift resistor may mean:

- CMOS digital level shifter
- Pull-up resistor
