= Standard logic =

Standard logic may refer to any of the following:

- Classical logic
- 7400 series
