= Cascode voltage switch logic =

Implementation of CVSL with a general Pull Down Network, where PDN1 and PDN2 must be mutually exclusive

Cascode Voltage Switch Logic (CVSL) refers to a CMOS-type logic family which is designed for certain advantages. It requires mainly N-channel MOSFET transistors to implement the logic using true and complementary input signals, and also needs two P-channel transistors at the top to pull one of the outputs high. This logic family is also known as Differential Cascode Voltage Switch Logic (DCVS or DCVSL).

== See also ==
- Logic family
