= Native transistor =

For electronic semiconductor devices, a native transistor (or sometimes natural transistor) is a variety of the MOS field-effect transistor that is intermediate between enhancement and depletion modes. Most common is the n-channel native transistor.

Historically, native transistors were referred to as MOSFETs without specially grown oxide, only natural thin oxide film formed over silicon during processing of other layers.

A native MOSFET is a transistor with nearly zero threshold voltage. Native n-channel transistors have a niche applications in low-voltage operational amplifiers and in low-voltage digital memory, where it functions as the weak pull-down. It is also used in low-voltage interface circuits. In most CMOS processes, native N-channel MOSFETs are fabricated on the "native" slightly p-doped silicon that comprises the bulk region, whereas a non-native N-channel MOSFET is fabricated in a p-well, which has a higher concentration of positive charges due to the increased presence of holes. The lower concentration of positive charges in the channel of a native device means that less voltage at the gate terminal is required to repel these positive charges and form a depletion region under the gate with a conducting channel, which translates to the native device having a smaller threshold voltage.

The main disadvantages of the native transistor are the larger size due to additional doping mask, and sometimes lower transconductance. Native silicon has a lower conductivity than silicon in an n-well or p-well, as most MOSFETs are, and therefore must be larger to achieve equivalent conductance. Typical minimal size of the native N-channel MOSFET (NMOS) gate is 2-3 times longer and wider than standard threshold voltage transistor. The cost of chips including native transistors is also increased because of the additional doping operations.
