= HCMOS =

Specifications for the 74HC00 IC family

HCMOS ("high-speed CMOS") is the set of specifications for electrical ratings and characteristics, forming the 74HC00 family, a part of the 7400 series of integrated circuits.

The 74HC00 family followed, and improved upon, the 74C00 series (which provided an alternative CMOS logic family to the 4000 series but retained the part number scheme and pinouts of the standard 7400 series (especially the 74LS00 series)).

Some specifications include:

- DC supply voltage (Vcc): the "74HC" and "74HCU" units could use 2.0–6.0 volts, unlike the earlier 5.0±0.5 volt units and "74HCT"
- DC input voltage range, DC output voltage range: between 0 and Vcc
- input rise and fall times: depends on input voltage, ranging from 1000 ns at 2.0 volts and 400 ns at 6.0 volts
- output rise and fall times

The typical maximum frequency (fmax) is noted as 60 MHz. For a comparison between 7400 types, see 7400-series integrated circuits § Families.

HCMOS also stands for high-density CMOS. The term was used to describe microprocessors, and other complex integrated circuits, which use a smaller manufacturing process, producing more transistors per area. The Freescale 68HC11 is an example of a popular HCMOS microcontroller.

== Variations ==
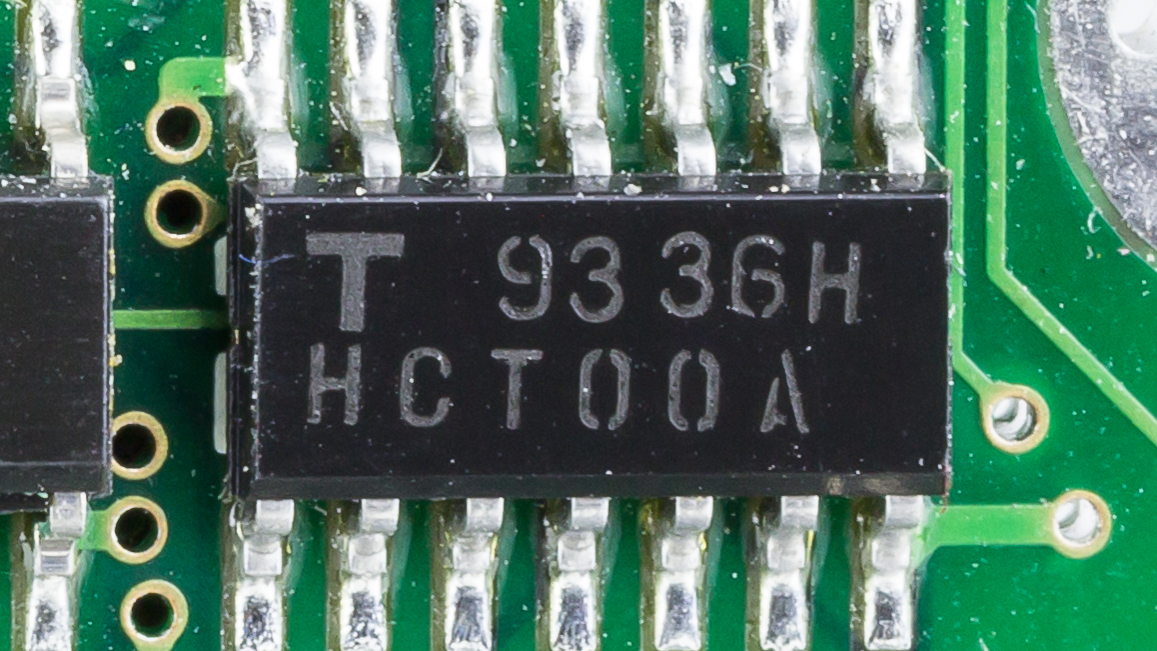
Toshiba HCT00A - NAND Gates

- HCT stands for high-speed CMOS with transistor–transistor logic voltages. These devices are similar to the HCMOS types except they will operate at standard TTL power supply voltages and logic input levels. This allows for direct pin-to-pin compatible CMOS replacements to reduce power consumption without loss of speed.
- HCU stands for high-speed CMOS un-buffered. This type of CMOS contains no buffer and is ideal for crystals and other ceramic oscillators needing linearity.
- VHCMOS, or AHC, stands for very high-speed CMOS or advanced high-speed CMOS. Typical propagation delay time is between 3 ns and 4 ns. The speed is similar to Bipolar Schottky transistor TTL.
- AHCT stands for advanced high-speed CMOS with TTL inputs. Typical propagation delay time is between 5 ns and 6 ns.
