= Reflected-wave switching =

Signalling technique used in backplane computer buses

Reflected-wave switching is a signalling technique used in backplane computer buses such as PCI.

== Purpose and mechanism in backplane computer buses ==
A backplane computer bus is a type of multilayer printed circuit board that has at least one (almost) solid layer of copper called the ground plane, and at least one layer of copper tracks that are used as wires for the signals. Each signal travels along a transmission line formed by its track and the narrow strip of ground plane directly beneath it. This structure is known in radio engineering as microstrip line.

Each signal travels from a transmitter to one or more receivers. Most computer buses use binary digital signals, which are sequences of pulses of fixed amplitude. In order to receive the correct data, the receiver must detect each pulse once, and only once. To ensure this, the designer must take the high-frequency characteristics of the microstrip into account.

When a pulse is launched into the microstrip by the transmitter, its amplitude depends on the ratio of the impedances of the transmitter and the microstrip. The impedance of the transmitter is simply its output resistance. The impedance of the microstrip is its characteristic impedance, which depends on its dimensions and on the materials used in the backplane's construction. As the leading edge of the pulse (the incident wave) passes the receiver, it may or may not have sufficient amplitude to be detected. If it does, then the system is said to use incident-wave switching. This is the system used in most computer buses predating PCI, such as the VME bus.

When the pulse reaches the end of the microstrip, its behaviour depends on the circuit conditions at this point. If the microstrip is correctly terminated (usually with a combination of resistors), the pulse is absorbed and its energy is converted to heat. This is the case in an incident-wave switching bus. If, on the other hand, there is no termination at the end of the microstrip, and the pulse encounters an open circuit, it is reflected back towards its source. As this reflected wave travels back along the microstrip, its amplitude is added to that of the original pulse. As the reflected wave passes the receiver for a second time, this time from the opposite direction, it now has enough amplitude to be detected. This is what happens in a reflected-wave switching bus.

== In incident switching buses ==
In incident-wave switching buses, reflections from the end of the bus are undesirable and must be prevented by adding termination. Terminating an incident-wave trace varies in complexity from a DC-balanced, AC-coupled termination to a single resistor series terminator, but all incident wave terminations consume both power and space (Johnson and Graham, 1993). However, incident-wave switching buses can be significantly longer than reflected-wave switching buses operating at the same frequency.

If the limited bus length is acceptable, a reflected-wave switching bus will use less power, and fewer components to operate at a given frequency. The bus has to be short enough, such that a pulse may travel twice the length of the backplane (one complete journey for the incident wave, and another for the reflected wave), and stabilize sufficiently to be read in a single bus cycle. The travel time can be calculated by dividing the round-trip length of the bus by the speed of propagation of the signal (which is roughly one half to two-thirds of c, the speed of light in vacuum).
