= Access time =

Latency between a request to an electronic system and the access being completed

Access time is the time delay or latency between a request to an electronic system and the access being initiated or the requested data being returned.

In computer and software systems, it is the time interval between the point where an instruction control unit initiates a call to retrieve data or a request to store data and the point at which delivery of the data is completed or the storage is started. Note that in distributed software systems or other systems with stochastic processes, access time or latency should be measured at the 99th percentile.

== See also ==
- Memory latency
- Mechanical latency
- Rotational latency
- Seek time
