= Karem A. Sakallah =

American electrical engineer and computer scientist

Karem Sakallah is an American electrical engineer and computer scientist, a professor at University of Michigan known for his work on computational logic, functional verification, SAT solvers, satisfiability modulo theories, and the Graph automorphism problem. He was elevated to the rank of IEEE Fellow in 1998. In 2009, he shared the CAV (Computer Aided Verification) award with eight other individuals "for major advances in creating high-performance Boolean satisfiability solvers." In 2012, Sakallah became an ACM Fellow "for algorithms for Boolean Satisfiability that advanced the state-of-the-art of hardware verification."

In 2014, Sakallah help shape the development of the Qatar Computing Research Institute (QCRI) in Doha and supervised the growth of the Cyber Security Research Area.
