= RSNF =

RSNF may refer to:

- Royal Saudi Naval Forces
- Ring sum normal form, a special normal form in Boolean mathematics
