= Zhegalkin algebra =

Boolean algebra concept

In mathematics, Zhegalkin algebra is a set of Boolean functions defined by the nullary operation taking the value $1$, use of the binary operation of conjunction $\land$, and use of the binary sum operation for modulo 2 $\oplus$. The constant $0$ is introduced as $1 \oplus 1 = 0$. The negation operation is introduced by the relation $\neg x = x \oplus 1$. The disjunction operation follows from the identity $x \lor y = x \land y \oplus x \oplus y$.

Using Zhegalkin Algebra, any perfect disjunctive normal form can be uniquely converted into a Zhegalkin polynomial (via the Zhegalkin Theorem).

== Basic identities ==
- $x \land ( y \land z) = (x \land y) \land z$, $x \land y = y \land x$
- $x \oplus ( y \oplus z) = (x \oplus y) \oplus z$, $x \oplus y = y \oplus x$
- $x \oplus x = 0$
- $x \oplus 0 = x$
- $x \land ( y \oplus z) = x \land y \oplus x \land z$

Thus, the basis of Boolean functions $\bigl\langle \wedge, \oplus, 1 \bigr\rangle$ is functionally complete.

Its inverse logical basis $\bigl\langle \lor, \odot, 0 \bigr\rangle$ is also functionally complete, where $\odot$ is the inverse of the XOR operation (via equivalence). For the inverse basis, the identities are inverse as well: $0 \odot 0 = 1$ is the output of a constant, $\neg x = x \odot 0$ is the output of the negation operation, and $x \land y = x \lor y \odot x \odot y$ is the conjunction operation.

The functional completeness of the two bases follows from completeness of the basis $\{\neg, \land, \lor\}$.

== See also ==
- Zhegalkin polynomial
