= Conjunction/disjunction duality =

Properties linking logical conjunction and disjunction

In propositional logic and Boolean algebra, there is a duality between conjunction and disjunction, also called the duality principle. It is the most widely known example of duality in logic. The duality consists in these metalogical theorems:

- In classical propositional logic, the connectives for conjunction and disjunction can be defined in terms of each other, and consequently, only one of them needs to be taken as primitive.
- If $\varphi^{D}$ is used as notation to designate the result of replacing every instance of conjunction with disjunction, and every instance of disjunction with conjunction (e.g. $p \land q$ with $q \lor p$, or vice-versa), in a given formula $\varphi$, and if $\overline{\varphi}$ is used as notation for replacing every sentence-letter in $\varphi$ with its negation (e.g., $p$ with $\neg p$), and if the symbol $\models$ is used for semantic consequence and ⟚ for semantical equivalence between logical formulas, then it is demonstrable that $\varphi^{D}$ ⟚ $\neg \overline{\varphi}$, and also that $\varphi \models \psi$ if, and only if, $\psi^{D} \models \varphi^{D}$, and furthermore that if $\varphi$ ⟚ $\psi$ then $\varphi^{D}$ ⟚ $\psi^{D}$. (In this context, $\overline{\varphi}^{D}$ is called the dual of a formula $\varphi$.)

== Mutual definability ==
The connectives may be defined in terms of each other as follows:

$\varphi\vee\psi :\equiv\neg(\neg\varphi\and\neg\psi).$ (1)
$\varphi\and\psi :\equiv \neg(\neg\varphi\vee\neg\psi).$ (2)
$\neg(\neg\varphi\vee\neg\psi)\equiv\neg\neg(\neg\neg\varphi\and\neg\neg\psi)\equiv\varphi\and\psi.$ (3)

=== Functional completeness ===
Since the Disjunctive Normal Form Theorem shows that the set of connectives $\{\and, \vee, \neg\}$ is functionally complete, these results show that the sets of connectives $\{\and, \neg\}$ and $\{\vee, \neg\}$ are themselves functionally complete as well.

=== De Morgan's laws ===
De Morgan's laws also follow from the definitions of these connectives in terms of each other, whichever direction is taken to do it.

$\neg(\varphi\vee\psi)\equiv\neg\varphi\and\neg\psi.$ (4)

$\neg(\varphi\and\psi)\equiv\neg\varphi\vee\neg\psi.$ (5)

== Duality properties ==
The dual of a sentence is what you get by swapping all occurrences of $\vee$ and $\and$, while also negating all propositional constants. For example, the dual of $(A\and B\vee C)$ would be $(\neg A\vee\neg B\and\neg C)$. The dual of a formula $\varphi$ is notated as $\varphi^*$. The Duality Principle states that in classical propositional logic, any sentence is equivalent to the negation of its dual.

Duality Principle: For all $\varphi$, we have that $\varphi=\neg(\varphi^*)$.
Proof: By induction on complexity. For the base case, we consider an arbitrary atomic sentence $A$. Since its dual is $\neg A$, the negation of its dual will be $\neg\neg A$, which is indeed equivalent to $A$. For the induction step, we consider an arbitrary $\varphi$ and assume that the result holds for all sentences of lower complexity. Three cases:
1. If $\varphi$ is of the form $\neg\psi$ for some $\psi$, then its dual will be $\neg(\psi^*)$ and the negation of its dual will therefore be $\neg\neg(\psi^*)$. Now, since $\psi$ is less complex than $\varphi$, the induction hypothesis gives us that $\psi=\neg(\psi^*)$. By substitution, this gives us that $\varphi=\neg\neg(\psi^*)$, which is to say that $\varphi$ is equivalent to the negation of its dual.
2. If $\varphi$ is of the form $(\psi\vee\chi)$ for some $\psi$ and $\chi$, then its dual will be $(\psi^*\and\chi^*)$, and the negation of its dual will therefore be $\neg(\psi^*\and\chi^*)$. Now, since $\psi$ and $\chi$ are less complex than $\varphi$, the induction hypothesis gives us that $\psi=\neg(\psi^*)$ and $\chi=\neg(\chi^*)$. By substitution, this gives us that $\varphi=\neg(\psi^*)\vee\neg(\chi^*)$ which in turn gives us that $\varphi=\neg(\psi^*\and\chi^*)$ by DeMorgan's Law. And that is once again just to say that $\varphi$ is equivalent to the negation of its dual.
3. If $\varphi$ is of the form $\psi\vee\chi$, the result follows by analogous reasoning.

=== Further duality theorems ===
Assume $\varphi \models \psi$. Then $\overline{\varphi} \models \overline{\psi}$ by uniform substitution of $\neg P_i$ for $P_i$. Hence, $\neg \psi \models \neg \varphi$, by contraposition; so finally, $\psi^D \models \varphi^D$, by the property that $\varphi^{D}$ ⟚ $\neg \overline{\varphi}$, which was just proved above. And since $\varphi^{DD} = \varphi$, it is also true that $\varphi \models \psi$ if, and only if, $\psi^D \models \varphi^D$. And it follows, as a corollary, that if $\varphi \models \neg \psi$, then $\varphi^D \models \neg \psi^D$.

== Conjunctive and disjunctive normal forms ==
For a formula $\varphi$ in disjunctive normal form, the formula $\overline{\varphi}^{D}$ will be in conjunctive normal form, and given the result that § Negation is semantically equivalent to dual, it will be semantically equivalent to $\neg \varphi$. This provides a procedure for converting between conjunctive normal form and disjunctive normal form. Since the Disjunctive Normal Form Theorem shows that every formula of propositional logic is expressible in disjunctive normal form, every formula is also expressible in conjunctive normal form by means of effecting the conversion to its dual.
