= Ivan Zhegalkin =

Russian mathematician

Ivan Ivanovich Zhegalkin (Russian: Ива́н Ива́нович Жега́лкин; 3 August 1869, Mtsensk – 28 March 1947, Moscow) was a Russian and Soviet mathematician. He is best known for his formulation of Boolean algebra as the theory of the ring of integers mod 2, via what are now called Zhegalkin polynomials.

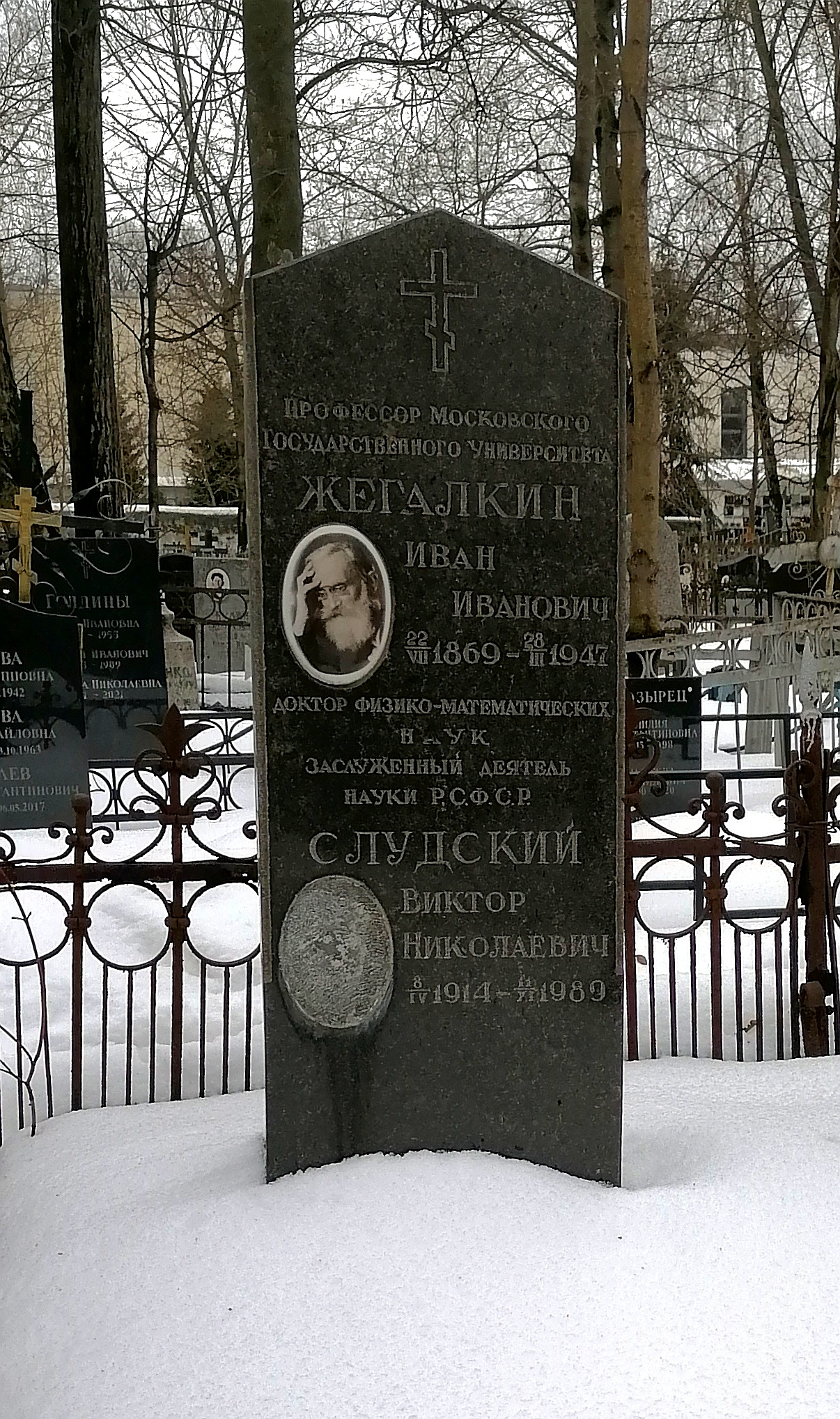
Ivan Zhegalkin's grave (top)

Zhegalkin was professor of mathematics at Moscow State University. He helped found the thriving mathematical logic group there, which became the Department of Mathematical Logic established by Sofya Yanovskaya in 1959. Reminiscing on his student days, Nikolai Luzin recalls Zhegalkin as the only professor he was not afraid of.
