= George Boolos =

American philosopher and logician (1940–1996)

- Born: George Stephen Boolos; September 4, 1940; New York City, U.S.
- Died: May 27, 1996 (aged 55); Cambridge, Massachusetts, U.S.

Education
- Education: Princeton University (AB); Oxford University; Massachusetts Institute of Technology (PhD)
- Thesis: The Hierarchy of Constructible Sets of Integers (1966)
- Doctoral advisor: Hilary Putnam

Philosophical work
- Era: 20th-century philosophy
- Region: Western philosophy
- School: Analytic philosophy
- Institutions: Massachusetts Institute of Technology
- Doctoral students: Delia Graff Fara
- Main interests: Philosophy of mathematics, mathematical logic
- Notable ideas: Hume's principle Nonfirstorderizability; The Hardest Logic Puzzle Ever

George Stephen Boolos (/ˈbuːloʊs/; September 4, 1940 – May 27, 1996) was an American philosopher and a mathematical logician who taught at the Massachusetts Institute of Technology.

== Life ==
Boolos was of Greek-Jewish descent. He graduated with an A.B. in mathematics from Princeton University after completing a senior thesis, titled "A simple proof of Gödel's first incompleteness theorem", under the supervision of Raymond Smullyan. Oxford University awarded him the B.Phil. in 1963. In 1966, he obtained the first PhD in philosophy ever awarded by the Massachusetts Institute of Technology, under the direction of Hilary Putnam. After teaching three years at Columbia University, he returned to MIT in 1969, where he spent the rest of his career.

A charismatic speaker well known for his clarity and wit, he once delivered a lecture (1994b) giving an account of Gödel's second incompleteness theorem, employing only words of one syllable. At the end of his viva, Hilary Putnam asked him, "And tell us, Mr. Boolos, what does the analytical hierarchy have to do with the real world?" Without hesitating Boolos replied, "It's part of it". An expert on puzzles of all kinds, in 1993 Boolos reached the London Regional Final of The Times crossword competition. His score was one of the highest ever recorded by an American. He wrote a paper on "The Hardest Logic Puzzle Ever"—one of many puzzles created by Raymond Smullyan.

Boolos died of pancreatic cancer on 27 May 1996.

== Work ==
Boolos coauthored with Richard Jeffrey the first three editions of the classic university text on mathematical logic, Computability and Logic. The book is now in its fifth edition, the last two editions updated by John P. Burgess.

Kurt Gödel wrote the first paper on provability logic, which applies modal logic—the logic of necessity and possibility—to the theory of mathematical proof, but Gödel never developed the subject to any significant extent. Boolos was one of its earliest proponents and pioneers, and he produced the first book-length treatment of it, The Unprovability of Consistency, published in 1979. The solution of a major unsolved problem some years later led to a new treatment, The Logic of Provability, published in 1993. The modal-logical treatment of provability helped demonstrate the "intensionality" of Gödel's Second Incompleteness Theorem, meaning that the theorem's correctness depends on the precise formulation of the provability predicate. These conditions were first identified by David Hilbert and Paul Bernays in their Grundlagen der Arithmetik. The unclear status of the Second Theorem was noted for several decades by logicians such as Georg Kreisel and Leon Henkin, who asked whether the formal sentence expressing "This sentence is provable" (as opposed to the Gödel sentence, "This sentence is not provable") was provable and hence true. Martin Löb showed Henkin's conjecture to be true, as well as identifying an important "reflection" principle also neatly codified using the modal logic approach. Some of the key provability results involving the representation of provability predicates had been obtained earlier using very different methods by Solomon Feferman.

Boolos was an authority on the 19th-century German mathematician and philosopher Gottlob Frege. Boolos proved a conjecture due to Crispin Wright (and also proved, independently, by others), that the system of Frege's Grundgesetze, long thought vitiated by Russell's paradox, could be freed of inconsistency by replacing one of its axioms, the notorious Basic Law V, with Hume's Principle. The resulting system has since been the subject of intense work.

Boolos argued that if one reads the second-order variables in monadic second-order logic plurally, then second-order logic can be interpreted as having no ontological commitment to entities other than those over which the first-order variables range. The result is plural quantification. David Lewis employed plural quantification in his Parts of Classes to derive a system in which Zermelo–Fraenkel set theory and the Peano axioms were all theorems. While Boolos is usually credited with plural quantification, Peter Simons (1982) has argued that the essential idea can be found in the work of Stanislaw Leśniewski.

Shortly before his death, Boolos chose 30 of his papers to be published in a book. The result is perhaps his most highly regarded work, his posthumous Logic, Logic, and Logic. This book reprints much of Boolos's work on the rehabilitation of Frege, as well as a number of his papers on set theory, second-order logic and nonfirstorderizability, plural quantification, proof theory, and three short insightful papers on Gödel's Incompleteness Theorem. There are also papers on Dedekind, Cantor, and Russell.

== Publications ==
=== Books ===
- 1979. The Unprovability of Consistency: An Essay in Modal Logic. Cambridge University Press.
- 1990 (editor). Meaning and Method: Essays in Honor of Hilary Putnam. Cambridge University Press.
- 1993. The Logic of Provability. Cambridge University Press.
- 1998 (Richard Jeffrey and John P. Burgess, eds.). Logic, Logic, and Logic Harvard University Press. ISBN 978-0674537675
- 2007 (1974) (with Richard Jeffrey and John P. Burgess). Computability and Logic, 4th ed. Cambridge University Press.

=== Articles ===
LLL = reprinted in Logic, Logic, and Logic.
FPM = reprinted in Demopoulos, W., ed., 1995. Frege's Philosophy of Mathematics. Harvard Univ. Press.

- 1968 (with Hilary Putnam), "Degrees of unsolvability of constructible sets of integers," Journal of Symbolic Logic 33: 497–513.
- 1969, "Effectiveness and natural languages" in Sidney Hook, ed., Language and Philosophy. New York University Press.
- 1970, "On the semantics of the constructible levels," 16: 139–148.
- 1970a, "A proof of the Löwenheim–Skolem theorem," Notre Dame Journal of Formal Logic 11: 76–78.
- 1971, "The iterative conception of set," Journal of Philosophy 68: 215–231. Reprinted in Paul Benacerraf and Hilary Putnam, eds.,1984. Philosophy of Mathematics: Selected Readings, 2nd ed. Cambridge Univ. Press: 486–502. LLL
- 1973, "A note on Evert Willem Beth's theorem," Bulletin de l'Academie Polonaise des Sciences 2: 1–2.
- 1974, "Arithmetical functions and minimization," Zeitschrift für mathematische Logik und Grundlagen der Mathematik 20: 353–354.
- 1974a, "Reply to Charles Parsons' 'Sets and classes'." First published in LLL.
- 1975, "Friedman's 35th problem has an affirmative solution," Notices of the American Mathematical Society 22: A-646.
- 1975a, "On Kalmar's consistency proof and a generalization of the notion of omega-consistency," Archiv für Mathematische Logik und Grundlagenforschung 17: 3–7.
- 1975b, "On second-order logic," Journal of Philosophy 72: 509–527. LLL.
- 1976, "On deciding the truth of certain statements involving the notion of consistency," Journal of Symbolic Logic 41: 779–781.
- 1977, "On deciding the provability of certain fixed point statements," Journal of Symbolic Logic 42: 191–193.
- 1979, "Reflection principles and iterated consistency assertions," Journal of Symbolic Logic 44: 33–35.
- 1980, "Omega-consistency and the diamond," Studia Logica 39: 237–243.
- 1980a, "On systems of modal logic with provability interpretations," Theoria 46: 7–18.
- 1980b, "Provability in arithmetic and a schema of Grzegorczyk," Fundamenta Mathematicae 106: 41–45.
- 1980c, "Provability, truth, and modal logic," Journal of Philosophical Logic 9: 1–7.
- 1980d, Review of Raymond M. Smullyan, What is the Name of This Book? The Philosophical Review 89: 467–470.
- 1981, "For every A there is a B," Linguistic Inquiry 12: 465–466.
- 1981a, Review of Robert M. Solovay, Provability Interpretations of Modal Logic," Journal of Symbolic Logic 46: 661–662.
- 1982, "Extremely undecidable sentences," Journal of Symbolic Logic 47: 191–196.
- 1982a, "On the nonexistence of certain normal forms in the logic of provability," Journal of Symbolic Logic 47: 638–640.
- 1984, "Don't eliminate cut," Journal of Philosophical Logic 13: 373–378. LLL.
- 1984a, "The logic of provability," American Mathematical Monthly 91: 470–480.
- 1984b, "Nonfirstorderizability again," Linguistic Inquiry 15: 343.
- 1984c, "On 'Syllogistic inference'," Cognition 17: 181–182.
- 1984d, "To be is to be the value of a variable (or some values of some variables)," Journal of Philosophy 81: 430–450. LLL.
- 1984e, "Trees and finite satisfiability: Proof of a conjecture of John Burgess," Notre Dame Journal of Formal Logic 25: 193–197.
- 1984f, "The justification of mathematical induction," PSA 2: 469–475. LLL.
- 1985, "1-consistency and the diamond," Notre Dame Journal of Formal Logic 26: 341–347.
- 1985a, "Nominalist Platonism," The Philosophical Review 94: 327–344. LLL.
- 1985b, "Reading the Begriffsschrift," Mind 94: 331–344. LLL; FPM: 163–81.
- 1985c (with Giovanni Sambin), "An incomplete system of modal logic," Journal of Philosophical Logic 14: 351–358.
- 1986, Review of Yuri Manin, A Course in Mathematical Logic, Journal of Symbolic Logic 51: 829–830.
- 1986–87, "Saving Frege from contradiction," Proceedings of the Aristotelian Society 87: 137–151. LLL; FPM 438–52.
- 1987, "The consistency of Frege's Foundations of Arithmetic" in J. J. Thomson, ed., 1987. On Being and Saying: Essays for Richard Cartwright. MIT Press: 3–20. LLL; FPM: 211–233.
- 1987a, "A curious inference," Journal of Philosophical Logic 16: 1–12. LLL.
- 1987b, "On notions of provability in provability logic," Abstracts of the 8th International Congress of Logic, Methodology and Philosophy of Science 5: 236–238.
- 1987c (with Vann McGee), "The degree of the set of sentences of predicate provability logic that are true under every interpretation," Journal of Symbolic Logic 52: 165–171.
- 1988, "Alphabetical order," Notre Dame Journal of Formal Logic 29: 214–215.
- 1988a, Review of Craig Smorynski, Self-Reference and Modal Logic, Journal of Symbolic Logic 53: 306–309.
- 1989, "Iteration again," Philosophical Topics 17: 5–21. LLL.
- 1989a, "A new proof of the Gödel incompleteness theorem," Notices of the American Mathematical Society 36: 388–390. LLL. An afterword appeared under the title "A letter from George Boolos," ibid., p. 676. LLL.
- 1990, "On 'seeing' the truth of the Gödel sentence," Behavioral and Brain Sciences 13: 655–656. LLL.
- 1990a, Review of Jon Barwise and John Etchemendy, Turing's World and Tarski's World, Journal of Symbolic Logic 55: 370–371.
- 1990b, Review of V. A. Uspensky, Gödel's Incompleteness Theorem, Journal of Symbolic Logic 55: 889–891.
- 1990c, "The standard of equality of numbers" in Boolos, G., ed., Meaning and Method: Essays in Honor of Hilary Putnam. Cambridge Univ. Press: 261–278. LLL; FPM: 234–254.
- 1991, "Zooming down the slippery slope," Nous 25: 695–706. LLL.
- 1991a (with Giovanni Sambin), "Provability: The emergence of a mathematical modality," Studia Logica 50: 1–23.
- 1993, "The analytical completeness of Dzhaparidze's polymodal logics," Annals of Pure and Applied Logic 61: 95–111.
- 1993a, "Whence the contradiction?" Aristotelian Society Supplementary Volume 67: 213–233. LLL.
- 1994, "1879?" in P. Clark and B. Hale, eds. Reading Putnam. Oxford: Blackwell: 31–48. LLL.
- 1994a, "The advantages of honest toil over theft," in A. George, ed., Mathematics and Mind. Oxford University Press: 27–44. LLL.
- 1994b, "Gödel's second incompleteness theorem explained in words of one syllable," Mind 103: 1–3. LLL.
- 1995, "Frege's theorem and the Peano postulates," Bulletin of Symbolic Logic 1: 317–326. LLL.
- 1995a, "Introductory note to *1951" in Solomon Feferman et al., eds., Kurt Gödel, Collected Works, vol. 3. Oxford University Press: 290–304. LLL. *1951 is Gödel's 1951 Gibbs lecture, "Some basic theorems on the foundations of mathematics and their implications."
- 1995b, "Quotational ambiguity" in Leonardi, P., and Santambrogio, M., eds. On Quine. Cambridge University Press: 283–296. LLL
- 1996, "The Hardest Logic Puzzle Ever," Harvard Review of Philosophy 6: 62–65. LLL. Italian translation by Massimo Piattelli-Palmarini, "L'indovinello piu difficile del mondo," La Repubblica (16 April 1992): 36–37.
- 1996a, "On the proof of Frege's theorem" in A. Morton and S. P. Stich, eds., Paul Benacerraf and his Critics. Cambridge MA: Blackwell. LLL.
- 1997, "Constructing Cantorian counterexamples," Journal of Philosophical Logic 26: 237–239. LLL.
- 1997a, "Is Hume's principle analytic?" In Richard G. Heck Jr., ed., Language, Thought, and Logic: Essays in Honour of Michael Dummett. Oxford Univ. Press: 245–61. LLL.
- 1997b (with Richard Heck), "Die Grundlagen der Arithmetik, §§82–83" in Matthias Schirn, ed., Philosophy of Mathematics Today. Oxford Univ. Press. LLL.
- 1998, "Gottlob Frege and the Foundations of Arithmetic." First published in LLL. French translation in Mathieu Marion and Alain Voizard eds., 1998. Frege. Logique et philosophie. Montréal and Paris: L'Harmattan: 17–32.
- 2000, "Must we believe in set theory?" in Gila Sher and Richard Tieszen, eds., Between Logic and Intuition: Essays in Honour of Charles Parsons. Cambridge University Press. LLL.

== See also ==
- American philosophy
- Axiomatic set theory S of Boolos (1989)
- General set theory, Boolos's axiomatic set theory just adequate for Peano and Robinson arithmetic.
- List of American philosophers
