= Infinity (philosophy) =

Philosophical concept

In philosophy and theology, infinity is explored in articles under headings such as the Absolute, God, and Zeno's paradoxes.

In Greek philosophy, for example in Anaximander, 'the Boundless' is the origin of all that is. He took the beginning or first principle to be an endless, unlimited primordial mass (ἄπειρον, apeiron). The Jain metaphysics and mathematics were the first to define and delineate different "types" of infinities. The work of the mathematician Georg Cantor first placed infinity into a coherent mathematical framework. Keenly aware of his departure from traditional wisdom, Cantor also presented a comprehensive historical and philosophical discussion of infinity. In Christian theology, for example in the work of Duns Scotus, the infinite nature of God invokes a sense of being without constraint, rather than a sense of being unlimited in quantity.

== Early thinking ==
=== Greek ===
==== Anaximander ====
Anaximander was an early thinker who engaged with the idea of infinity, considering it a foundational and primitive basis of reality. Anaximander was the first in the Greek philosophical tradition to propose that the universe is infinite.

==== Anaxagoras ====
Anaxagoras (500–428 BCE) believed that the matter in the universe has an innate capacity for infinite division.

==== The Atomists ====
A group of thinkers of ancient Greece (later identified as the Atomists) all similarly considered matter to be made of an infinite number of structures as considered by imagining dividing or separating matter from itself an infinite number of times.

==== Aristotle and after ====
Aristotle, alive for the period 384–322 BCE, is credited with being the root of a field of thought, in his influence of succeeding thinking for a period spanning more than one subsequent millennium, by his rejection of the idea of actual infinity.

In Book 3 of his work entitled Physics, Aristotle deals with the concept of infinity in terms of his notion of actuality and of potentiality.

... It is always possible to think of a larger number: for the number of times a magnitude can be bisected is infinite. Hence the infinite is potential, never actual; the number of parts that can be taken always surpasses any assigned number.

— Physics 207b8

This is often called potential infinity; however, there are two ideas mixed up with this. One is that it is always possible to find a number of things that surpasses any given number, even if there are not actually such things. The other is that we may quantify over infinite sets without restriction. For example, $\forall n \in \mathbb{Z} (\exists m \in \mathbb{Z} [m > n \wedge P(m)] )$, which reads, "for any integer n, there exists an integer m > n such that P(m)". The second view is found in a clearer form by medieval writers such as William of Ockham:

Sed omne continuum est actualiter existens. Igitur quaelibet pars sua est vere existens in rerum natura. Sed partes continui sunt infinitae quia non tot quin plures, igitur partes infinitae sunt actualiter existentes.

But every continuum is actually existent. Therefore any of its parts is really existent in nature. But the parts of the continuum are infinite because there are not so many that there are not more, and therefore the infinite parts are actually existent.

The parts are actually there, in some sense. However, in this view, no infinite magnitude can have a number, for whatever number we can imagine, there is always a larger one: "There are not so many (in number) that there are no more."

Aristotle's views on the continuum foreshadow some topological aspects of modern mathematical theories of the continuum. Aristotle's emphasis on the connectedness of the continuum may have inspired—in different ways—modern philosophers and mathematicians such as Charles Sanders Peirce, Cantor, and L. E. J. Brouwer.

Among the scholastics, Aquinas also argued against the idea that infinity could be in any sense complete or a totality.

Aristotle deals with infinity in the context of the prime mover, in Book 7 of the same work, the reasoning of which was later studied and commented on by Simplicius.

=== Roman ===
==== Plotinus ====
Plotinus considered infinity, during the 3rd century A.D.

==== Simplicius ====
Simplicius, alive circa 490 to 560 AD, thought the concept "Mind" was infinite.

==== Augustine ====
Augustine thought infinity to be "incomprehensible for the human mind".

=== Early Indian thinking ===
The Jain upanga āgama Surya Prajnapti (c. 400 BC) classifies all numbers into three sets: enumerable, innumerable, and infinite. Each of these was further subdivided into three orders:

- Enumerable: lowest, intermediate and highest
- Innumerable: nearly innumerable, truly innumerable and innumerably innumerable
- Infinite: nearly infinite, truly infinite, infinitely infinite

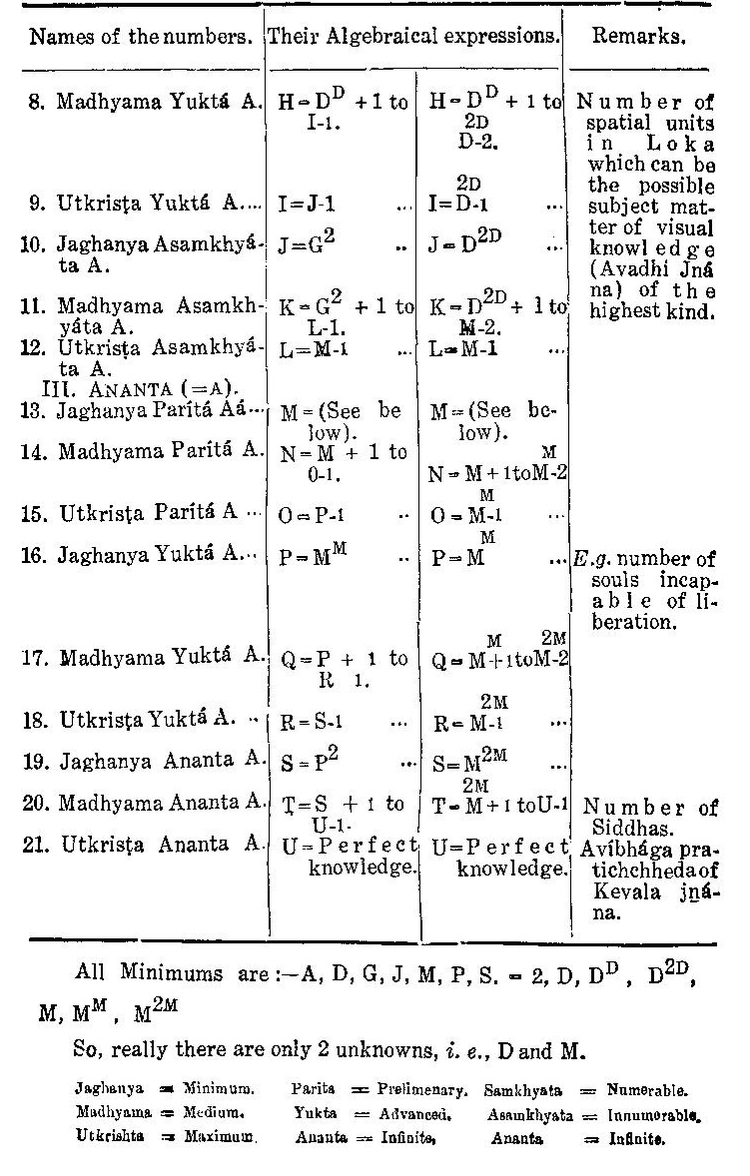
Jain theory of numbers (See IIIrd section for various infinities)

They also distinguished five types of infinity: infinity in one direction, infinity in two directions, infinity in area, infinity in all directions (that is, in volume), and perpetual infinity.

== Views from the Renaissance to modern times ==
=== Galileo ===
Galileo Galilei (February 15, 1564 – January 8, 1642) discussed the example of comparing the square numbers {1, 4, 9, 16, ...} with the natural numbers {1, 2, 3, 4, ...} as follows:

1 → 1
2 → 4
3 → 9
4 → 16
…

It appeared by this reasoning as though a "set" (Galileo did not use the terminology) which is naturally smaller than the "set" of which it is a part (since it does not contain all the members) is in some sense the same "size". Galileo found no way around this problem:

So far as I see we can only infer that the totality of all numbers is infinite, that the number of squares is infinite, and that the number of their roots is infinite; neither is the number of squares less than the totality of all numbers, nor the latter greater than the former; and finally the attributes "equal," "greater," and "less," are not applicable to infinite, but only to finite, quantities.

— On two New Sciences, 1638

The idea that size can be measured by one-to-one correspondence is today known as Hume's principle, although Hume, like Galileo, believed the principle could not be applied to the infinite. The same concept, applied by Georg Cantor, is used in relation to infinite sets.

=== Thomas Hobbes ===
Famously, the ultra-empiricist Hobbes (April 5, 1588 – December 4, 1679) tried to defend the idea of a potential infinity in light of the discovery, by Evangelista Torricelli, of a figure (Gabriel's Horn) whose surface area is infinite, but whose volume is finite. Not reported, this motivation of Hobbes came too late as curves having infinite length yet bounding finite areas were known much before.

=== John Locke ===
Locke (August 29, 1632 – October 28, 1704) in common with most of the empiricist philosophers, also believed that we can have no proper idea of the infinite. They believed all our ideas were derived from sense data or "impressions," and since all sensory impressions are inherently finite, so too are our thoughts and ideas. Our idea of infinity is merely negative or privative.

Whatever positive ideas we have in our minds of any space, duration, or number, let them be never so great, they are still finite; but when we suppose an inexhaustible remainder, from which we remove all bounds, and wherein we allow the mind an endless progression of thought, without ever completing the idea, there we have our idea of infinity... yet when we would frame in our minds the idea of an infinite space or duration, that idea is very obscure and confused, because it is made up of two parts very different, if not inconsistent. For let a man frame in his mind an idea of any space or number, as great as he will, it is plain the mind rests and terminates in that idea; which is contrary to the idea of infinity, which consists in a supposed endless progression.

— Essay, II. xvii. 7., author's emphasis

He considered that in considerations on the subject of eternity, which he classified as an infinity, humans are likely to make mistakes.

== Modern philosophical views ==
Modern discussion of the infinite is now regarded as part of set theory and mathematics. Contemporary philosophers of mathematics engage with the topic of infinity and generally acknowledge its role in mathematical practice. Although set theory is now widely accepted, this was not always so. Influenced by L.E.J Brouwer and verificationism in part, Wittgenstein (April 26, 1889 – April 29, 1951) made an impassioned attack upon axiomatic set theory, and upon the idea of the actual infinite, during his "middle period".

Does the relation $m = 2n$ correlate the class of all numbers with one of its subclasses? No. It correlates any arbitrary number with another, and in that way we arrive at infinitely many pairs of classes, of which one is correlated with the other, but which are never related as class and subclass. Neither is this infinite process itself in some sense or other such a pair of classes... In the superstition that $m = 2n$ correlates a class with its subclass, we merely have yet another case of ambiguous grammar.

— Philosophical Remarks § 141, cf Philosophical Grammar p. 465

Unlike the traditional empiricists, he thought that the infinite was in some way given to sense experience.

... I can see in space the possibility of any finite experience... we recognize [the] essential infinity of space in its smallest part." "[Time] is infinite in the same sense as the three-dimensional space of sight and movement is infinite, even if in fact I can only see as far as the walls of my room.

... what is infinite about endlessness is only the endlessness itself.

=== Emmanuel Levinas ===
The philosopher Emmanuel Levinas (January 12, 1906 – December 25, 1995) uses infinity to designate that which cannot be defined or reduced to knowledge or power. In Levinas' magnum opus Totality and Infinity he says :

...infinity is produced in the relationship of the same with the other, and how the particular and the personal, which are unsurpassable, as it were magnetize the very field in which the production of infinity is enacted...

The idea of infinity is not an incidental notion forged by a subjectivity to reflect the case of an entity encountering on the outside nothing that limits it, overflowing every limit, and thereby infinite. The production of the infinite entity is inseparable from the idea of infinity, for it is precisely in the disproportion between the idea of infinity and the infinity of which it is the idea that this exceeding of limits is produced. The idea of infinity is the mode of being, the infinition, of infinity... All knowing qua intentionality already presupposes the idea of infinity, which is preeminently non-adequation.

— p. 26-27

Levinas also wrote a work entitled Philosophy and the Idea of Infinity, which was published during 1957.

== See also ==
- Infinite monkey theorem
- Measure problem (cosmology)
- Philosophy of space and time
