= Plural quantification =

Mathematical theory

In mathematics and logic, plural quantification is the theory that an individual variable x may take on plural, as well as singular, values. As well as substituting individual objects such as Alice, the number 1, the tallest building in London etc. for x, we may substitute both Alice and Bob, or all the numbers between 0 and 10, or all the buildings in London over 20 stories.

The point of the theory is to give first-order logic the power of set theory, but without any "existential commitment" to such objects as sets. The classic expositions are Boolos 1984 and Lewis 1991.

== History ==
The view is commonly associated with George Boolos, though it is older (see notably Simons 1982), and is related to the view of classes defended by John Stuart Mill and other nominalist philosophers. Mill argued that universals or "classes" are not a peculiar kind of thing, having an objective existence distinct from the individual objects that fall under them, but "is neither more nor less than the individual things in the class". (Mill 1904, II. ii. 2, also I. iv. 3).

A similar position was also discussed by Bertrand Russell in chapter VI of Russell (1903), but later dropped in favour of a "no-classes" theory. See also Gottlob Frege 1895 for a critique of an earlier view defended by Ernst Schroeder.

The general idea can be traced back to Leibniz. (Levey 2011, pp. 129–133)

Interest revived in plurals with work in linguistics in the 1970s by Remko Scha, Godehard Link, Fred Landman, Friederike Moltmann, Roger Schwarzschild, Peter Lasersohn and others, who developed ideas for a semantics of plurals.

== Background and motivation ==
=== Multigrade (variably polyadic) predicates and relations ===
Sentences like

Alice and Bob cooperate.
Alice, Bob and Carol cooperate.

are said to involve a multigrade (also known as variably polyadic, also anadic) predicate or relation ("cooperate" in this example), meaning that they stand for the same concept even though they don't have a fixed arity (cf. Linnebo & Nicolas 2008). The notion of multigrade relation/predicate has appeared as early as the 1940s and has been notably used by Quine (cf. Morton 1975). Plural quantification deals with formalizing the quantification over the variable-length arguments of such predicates, e.g. "xx cooperate" where xx is a plural variable. Note that in this example it makes no sense, semantically, to instantiate xx with the name of a single person.

=== Nominalism ===
Broadly speaking, nominalism denies the existence of universals (abstract entities), like sets, classes, relations, properties, etc. Thus the plural logics were developed as an attempt to formalize reasoning about plurals, such as those involved in multigrade predicates, apparently without resorting to notions that nominalists deny, e.g. sets.

Standard first-order logic has difficulties in representing some sentences with plurals. Most well-known is the Geach–Kaplan sentence "some critics admire only one another". Kaplan proved that it is nonfirstorderizable (the proof can be found in that article). Hence its paraphrase into a formal language commits us to quantification over (i.e. the existence of) sets.

Boolos argued that second-order monadic quantification may be systematically interpreted in terms of plural quantification, and that, therefore, second-order monadic quantification is "ontologically innocent".

Later, Oliver & Smiley (2001), Rayo (2002), Yi (2005) and McKay (2006) argued that sentences such as

They are shipmates
They are meeting together
They lifted a piano
They are surrounding a building
They admire only one another

also cannot be interpreted in monadic second-order logic. This is because predicates such as "are shipmates", "are meeting together", "are surrounding a building" are not distributive. A predicate F is distributive if, whenever some things are F, each one of them is F. But in standard logic, every monadic predicate is distributive. Yet such sentences also seem innocent of any existential assumptions, and do not involve quantification.

So one can propose a unified account of plural terms that allows for both distributive and non-distributive satisfaction of predicates, while defending this position against the "singularist" assumption that such predicates are predicates of sets of individuals (or of mereological sums).

Several writers have suggested that plural logic opens the prospect of simplifying the foundations of mathematics, avoiding the paradoxes of set theory, and simplifying the complex and unintuitive axiom sets needed in order to avoid them.

Recently, Linnebo & Nicolas (2008) have suggested that natural languages often contain superplural variables (and associated quantifiers) such as "these people, those people, and these other people compete against each other" (e.g. as teams in an online game), while Nicolas (2008) has argued that plural logic should be used to account for the semantics of mass nouns, like "wine" and "furniture".

== Formal definition ==
This section presents a simple formulation of plural logic/quantification approximately the same as given by Boolos in Nominalist Platonism (Boolos 1985).

=== Syntax ===
Sub-sentential units are defined as

- Predicate symbols $F$, $G$, etc. (with appropriate arities, which are left implicit)
- Singular variable symbols $x$, $y$, etc.
- Plural variable symbols $\bar{x}$, $\bar{y}$, etc.

Full sentences are defined as

- If $F$ is an n-ary predicate symbol, and $x_0, \ldots, x_n$ are singular variable symbols, then $F(x_0, \ldots, x_n)$ is a sentence.
- If $P$ is a sentence, then so is $\neg P$
- If $P$ and $Q$ are sentences, then so is $P \land Q$
- If $P$ is a sentence and $x$ is a singular variable symbol, then $\exists x.P$ is a sentence
- If $x$ is a singular variable symbol and $\bar{y}$ is a plural variable symbol, then $x \prec \bar{y}$ is a sentence (where ≺ is usually interpreted as the relation "is one of")
- If $P$ is a sentence and $\bar{x}$ is a plural variable symbol, then $\exists \bar{x}.P$ is a sentence

The last two lines are the only essentially new component to the syntax for plural logic. Other logical symbols definable in terms of these can be used freely as notational shorthands.

This logic turns out to be equi-interpretable with monadic second-order logic.

=== Model theory ===
Plural logic's model theory/semantics is where the logic's lack of sets is cashed out. A model is defined as a tuple $(D,V,s,R)$ where $D$ is the domain, $V$ is a collection of valuations $V_F$ for each predicate name $F$ in the usual sense, and $s$ is a Tarskian sequence (assignment of values to variables) in the usual sense (i.e. a map from singular variable symbols to elements of $D$). The new component $R$ is a binary relation relating values in the domain to plural variable symbols.

Satisfaction is given as

- $(D,V,s,R) \models F(x_0, \ldots, x_n)$ iff $(s_{x_0}, \ldots, s_{x_n}) \in V_F$
- $(D,V,s,R) \models \neg P$ iff $(D,V,s,R) \nvDash P$
- $(D,V,s,R) \models P \land Q$ iff $(D,V,s,R) \models P$ and $(D,V,s,R) \models Q$
- $(D,V,s,R) \models \exists x.P$ iff there is an $s' \approx_x s$ such that $(D,V,s',R) \models P$
- $(D,V,s,R) \models x \prec \bar{y}$ iff $s_xR\bar{y}$
- $(D,V,s,R) \models \exists \bar{x}.P$ iff there is an $R' \approx_\bar{x} R$ such that $(D,V,s,R') \models P$

Where for singular variable symbols, $s \approx_x s'$ means that for all singular variable symbols $y$ other than $x$, it holds that $s_y = s'_y$, and for plural variable symbols, $R \approx_\bar{x} R'$ means that for all plural variable symbols $\bar{y}$ other than $\bar{x}$, and for all objects of the domain $d$, it holds that $dR\bar{y} = dR'\bar{y}$.

As in the syntax, only the last two are truly new in plural logic. Boolos observes that by using assignment relations $R$, the domain does not have to include sets, and therefore plural logic achieves ontological innocence while still retaining the ability to talk about the extensions of a predicate. Thus, the plural logic comprehension schema $\exists \bar{x}. \forall y. y \prec \bar{x} \leftrightarrow F(y)$ does not yield Russell's paradox because the quantification of plural variables does not quantify over the domain. Another aspect of the logic as Boolos defines it, crucial to this bypassing of Russell's paradox, is the fact that sentences of the form $F(\bar{x})$ are not well-formed: predicate names can only combine with singular variable symbols, not plural variable symbols.

This can be taken as the simplest, and most obvious argument that plural logic as Boolos defined it is ontologically innocent.

== See also ==
- Generalized quantifier
- Homogeneity (linguistics)
- Variadic function
