= Matthias Schirn =

German philosopher and logician (born 1944)

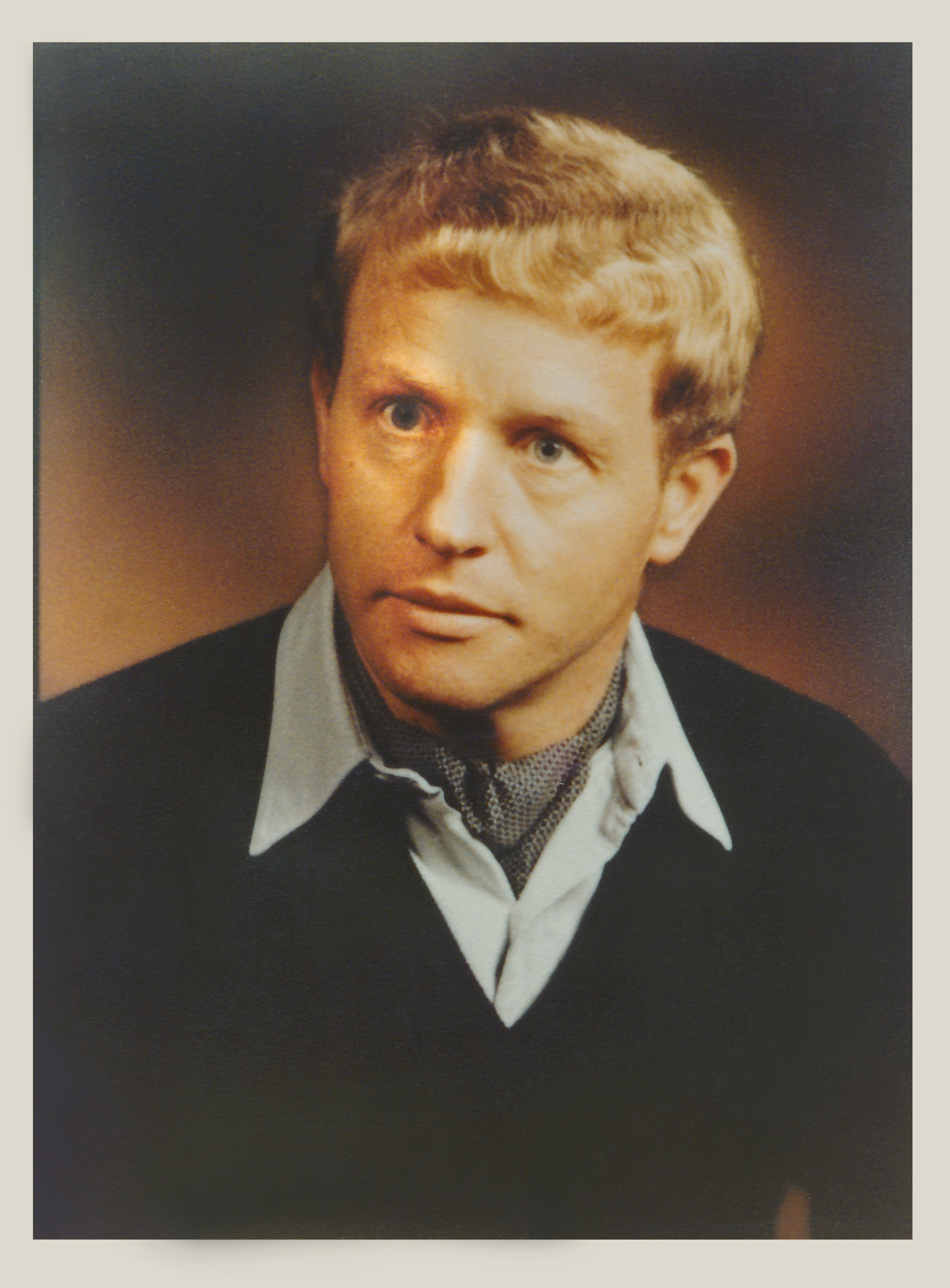
Matthias Schirn (philosopher) 1985

Matthias Schirn (born 03 October 1944 in Weidenau/Siegen) is a German philosopher and logician.

== Education and academic career ==
Schirn completed his doctoral degree at the University of Freiburg in 1974 with a thesis on identity and synonymy in logic and semantics and subsequently taught at University of Oxford, University of Cambridge and Michigan State University. Schirn’s research during this time focused on theories of meaning for natural languages and intensional semantics, and he continued working in this area at the University of California at Berkeley, St. John’s College (Oxford), Harvard University, and at Wolfson College (Oxford). In 1985, Schirn was awarded his habilitation at the University of Regensburg (Dr. phil. habil.) with a thesis on Frege’s philosophy of mathematics. Since 1987 he has held a distinguished Fiebiger-Professorship at LMU Munich and since 2012 he has been a member of the Munich Center for Mathematical Philosophy. He has also taught at the University of Minnesota (1989), the State University of Campinas (1991), the Catholic University of São Paulo (1998), the National University of Buenos Aires (1992), the National Autonomous University of Mexico (1993, 1994, 1997), the National University of San Marcos in Lima (2009) and numerous other universities in Europe and Latin America. Schirn has published in Mind, The Philosophical Quarterly, The Philosophical Review, Synthese, Erkenntnis, Axiomathes, Acta Analytica, The Journal of Symbolic Logic, The Review of Symbolic Logic, Notre Dame Journal of Formal Logic, Journal of Applied Logics, Reports on Mathematical Logic, History and Philosophy of Logic, Logique et Analyse, The British Journal for the Philosophy of Science, Metascience, Dialectica, Grazer Philosophische Studien, Kantstudien, Archiv für Geschichte der Philosophie, Theoria, Crítica, Manuscrito, and other international journals. He has given invited lectures at the most prestigious universities in Europe, Asia, Latin America and South Africa as well as at some of the most distinguished universities in the United States of America and Australia. In 2014, he delivered a series of lectures on Frege’s philosophy of mathematics at the University of Oxford and carried out related research at Wolfson College. In the same year, he was invited to work as a research professor at Kyoto University and received a research fellowship from the Japan Society for the Promotion of Science. Thanks to his academic activities all over the world since the beginning of his career, Schirn considers himself a cosmopolitan. Besides German, he speaks English, Spanish, Portuguese and French fluently and reads modern philosophical texts in Italian with relative ease. Schirn is familiar with Latin and ancient Greek.

== Research ==
Schirn has made contributions to the philosophy of language and epistemology and is best known for his work on Frege’s logic and philosophy of mathematics as well as on Hilbert’s metamathematics and related issues in the history and philosophy of logic and the foundations of mathematics. Concerning Frege’s philosophy of mathematics, Schirn has more recently focused and published on the introduction of logical objects by means of second-order abstraction principles, their logical, semantic and epistemological nature, the problem of referential indeterminacy of abstract singular terms to which those principles give rise in a Fregean context, cross-sortal identity claims, the foundations of cardinal arithmetic, of real analysis and of geometry, platonism and mathematical creation, identity and the cognitive value of logical equations and last but not least on some aspects of neo-logicism. He is currently preparing the publication of two books in English on Frege’s logic and philosophy of mathematics. In a series of articles co-authored by Karl-Georg Niebergall, Niebergall and Schirn presented Hilbert’s finitist proof-theoretic approach in a new light by paying close attention to the development of his metamathematical work in the period 1922-1939 and by using the logical resources of modern proof theory. One important result of their published work is that Peano Arithmetic proves its own consistency indirectly in one step and that recursively enumerable extensions of QF-IA (QF = quantifier free — IA = induction axiom) likewise prove their own consistency indirectly in one step. Schirn and Niebergall are also known for their analysis of Hilbert’s extensions of the finitist point of view in the light of Gödel’s incompleteness theorems and their attempted refutation of W. W. Tait’s widely accepted thesis that all finitist reasoning is primitive recursive (W.W. Tait, ‘Finitism’, Journal of Philosophy 78, 524-46). In recent years, Schirn has published more work on Hilbert’s metamathematics, for example, ‘The Finite and the Infinite: On Hilbert’s Formalist Approach Before and After Gödel’s Incompleteness Theorems’ in Logique et Analyse 62 (2019), 1-34.

== Personal life ==
Schirn is the partner of the Haitian-Dominican model Joanne Jean.

Hobbies

Schirn’s hobbies are the Romance languages, Latin American literature, visits to “exotic” countries around the world, chamber music and modern jazz, and sport (mainly road racing and swimming).

== Selected publications ==
=== Books ===
- Sprachhandlung — Existenz —Wahrheit. Hauptthemen der sprachanalytischen Philosophie (ed.), Frommann-Holzboog, Stuttgart-Bad Cannstatt 1974.
- Identität und Synonymie, Frommann-Holzboog, Stuttgart-Bad Cannstatt 1975.
- Studien zu Frege — Studies on Frege vols. I - III (ed.), Frommann-Holzboog, Stuttgart-Bad Cannstatt 1976.
- Frege: Importance and Legacy (ed.), Walter de Gruyter, Berlin, New York 1996.
- The Philosophy of Mathematics Today (ed.), Oxford University Press, Oxford 1998.
- Together with Guido Imaguire, Estudos em Filosofia da Linguagem, Edições Loyola, São Paulo 2008.
- Frege on the Foundations of Mathematics, Synthese Library Series. Studies in Epistemology, Logic, Methodology, and Philosophy of Science, Springer, London, New York 2025.
- Frege’s Logic, Philosophy of Mathematics, and Beyond, Synthese Library Series. Studies in Epistemology, Logic, Methodology, and Philosophy of Science, Springer, London, New York 2026.
- Sinn, Bedeutung, Wahrheit. Untersuchungen zu Freges Sprachphilosophie und Logik, 2026.

== Awards ==
- Research fellowships of Deutsche Forschungsgemeinschaft (DFG) 1978-1980 and 1986-1988.
- Research grant of Deutscher Akademischer Austauschdienst (DAAD) and CONARE, National University of Costa Rica, Heredia, 2000.
- Research grant of Coordenação de Aperfeiçoamento de Pessoal de Nivel Superior (CAPES), Federal University of Ceará, Fortaleza, 2009.
- Research grant of CAPES, Federal University of Rio de Janeiro, Rio de Janeiro, 2011.
- Research fellowship of the Japan Society for the Promotion of Science (JSPS), Kyoto University, 2014.
