= Crispin Wright =

British philosopher (born 1942)

- Born: Crispin James Garth Wright; 21 December 1942 (age 83); Surrey, England

Education
- Education: Trinity College, Cambridge; University of Oxford
- Academic advisors: Michael Dummett; Casimir Lewy

Philosophical work
- Era: Contemporary philosophy
- Region: Western philosophy
- School: Analytic; Neo-logicism (Scottish school)
- Institutions: All Souls College, Oxford
- Main interests: Philosophy of mind Philosophy of language Philosophy of mathematics Frege · Wittgenstein; Epistemology
- Notable ideas: Rule-following considerations Neo-logicism; Truth pluralism Epistemic entitlement Superassertibility; Anti-realist semantics for empirical language Warrant transmission failure Cornerstone proposition

Crispin James Garth Wright (/raɪt/; born 21 December 1942) is a British philosopher, who has written on neo-Fregean (neo-logicist) philosophy of mathematics, Wittgenstein's later philosophy, and on issues related to truth, realism, cognitivism, skepticism, knowledge, and objectivity. He is Professor of Philosophical Research at the University of Stirling, and taught previously at the University of St Andrews, University of Aberdeen, New York University, Princeton University and University of Michigan.

== Life and career ==
Wright was born in Surrey and was educated at Birkenhead School (1950–61) and at Trinity College, Cambridge, graduating in Moral Sciences in 1964 and taking a PhD in 1968. He took an Oxford University BPhil in 1969 and was elected Prize Fellow and then Research Fellow at All Souls College, Oxford, where he worked until 1978. He then moved to the University of St. Andrews, where he was appointed Professor of Logic and Metaphysics and then the first Bishop Wardlaw University Professorship in 1997. From fall 2008 to spring 2023, he was professor in the Department of Philosophy at New York University (NYU). He has also taught at the University of Michigan, Oxford University, Columbia University, and Princeton University. Crispin Wright was founder and director of Arché at the University of St. Andrews, which he left in September 2009 to take up leadership of the Northern Institute of Philosophy (NIP) at the University of Aberdeen. Once NIP ceased operations in 2015, Wright moved to the University of Stirling.

== Philosophical work ==
In the philosophy of mathematics, he is best known for his book Frege's Conception of Numbers as Objects (1983), where he argues that Gottlob Frege's logicist project could be revived by removing the axiom schema of unrestricted comprehension (sometimes referred to as Basic Law V) from the formal system. Arithmetic is then derivable in second-order logic from Hume's principle. He gives informal arguments that (i) Hume's principle plus second-order logic is consistent, and (ii) from it one can produce the Dedekind–Peano axioms. Both results were proven informally by Frege (Frege's theorem), and would later be more rigorously proven by George Boolos and Richard Heck. Wright is one of the major proponents of neo-logicism, alongside his frequent collaborator Bob Hale. He has also written Wittgenstein and the Foundations of Mathematics (1980).

In general metaphysics, his most important work is Truth and Objectivity (Harvard University Press, 1992). He argues in this book that there need be no single, discourse-invariant thing in which truth consists, making an analogy with identity. There need only be some principles regarding how the truth predicate can be applied to a sentence, some 'platitudes' about true sentences. Wright also argues that in some contexts, probably including moral contexts, superassertibility will effectively function as a truth predicate. He defines a predicate as superassertible if and only if it is "assertible" in some state of information and then remains so no matter how that state of information is enlarged upon or improved. Assertiveness is warrant by whatever standards inform the discourse in question. Many of his most important papers in philosophy of language, epistemology, philosophical logic, meta-ethics, and the interpretation of Wittgenstein have been collected in the two volumes published by Harvard University Press in 2001 and 2003.

In epistemology, Wright has argued that G. E. Moore's proof of an external world ("Here is one hand") is logically valid but cannot transmit warrant from its premise to the conclusion, as it instantiates a form of epistemic circularity called by him "warrant transmission failure". Wright has also developed a variant of Ludwig Wittgenstein's hinge epistemology, introduced in Wittgenstein's On Certainty as a response to radical skepticism. According to hinge epistemology, there are assumptions or presuppositions of any enquiry – called "hinge propositions" – that cannot themselves be rationally doubted, challenged, established or defended. Examples of hinges are the propositions that there are universal regularities in nature, that our sense organs are normally reliable, and that we do not live in a skeptical scenario (such as that in which we are globally hallucinated by a Cartesian evil demon or the more recent simulation hypothesis). Wright instead contends that certain hinge propositions can actually be rationally held because there exists a type of non-evidential, a priori warrant – which Wright calls "epistemic entitlement" – for accepting them as true. In collaboration with epistemologist Luca Moretti, Wright has further developed this theory to the effect that we are entitled to ignore the possibility that we live in a skeptical scenario.

== Awards ==
- Fellow of the American Academy of Arts and Sciences, 2012
- Leverhulme Trust Personal Research Professor, 1998–2003
- FRSE: Fellow of the Royal Society of Edinburgh, 1996
- FBA: Fellow of the British Academy, 1992
- British Academy Research Reader, 1990–2
- Fulbright scholar at Princeton University, 1985-6
- Prize Fellow, All Souls College, Oxford, 1969–71

== Books ==
- Wittgenstein on the Foundations of Mathematics (Harvard University Press, 1980)
- Frege's Conception of Numbers as Objects (Humanities Press 1983)
- Truth and Objectivity (Harvard University Press, 1992)
- Realism, Meaning, and Truth, 2nd edition (Blackwell 1993)
- The Reason's Proper Study (co-authored with Bob Hale) (Oxford University Press, 2001)
- Rails to Infinity (Harvard University Press, 2001)
- Saving the Differences (Harvard University Press, 2003)
- Expression and Self-Knowledge (co-authored with Dorit Bar-On) (Wiley-Blackwell, 2023)
