= Frege's theorem =

Metatheorem

In metalogic and metamathematics, Frege's theorem is a metatheorem that states that the Peano axioms of arithmetic can be derived in second-order logic from Hume's principle. It was first proven, informally, by Gottlob Frege in his 1884 The Foundations of Arithmetic and proven more formally in his 1893 Grundgesetze der Arithmetik I (Basic Laws of Arithmetic I). The theorem was re-discovered by Crispin Wright in the early 1980s and has since been the focus of significant work. It is at the core of the philosophy of mathematics known as neo-logicism (at least of the Scottish School variety).

== Overview ==
In The Foundations of Arithmetic (1884), and later, in Basic Laws of Arithmetic (vol. 1, 1893; vol. 2, 1903), Frege attempted to derive all of the laws of arithmetic from axioms he asserted as logical (see logicism). Most of these axioms were carried over from his Begriffsschrift; the one truly new principle was one he called the Basic Law V (now known as the axiom schema of unrestricted comprehension): the "value-range" of the function f(x) is the same as the "value-range" of the function g(x) if and only if ∀x[f(x) = g(x)]. However, not only did Basic Law V fail to be a logical proposition, but the resulting system proved to be inconsistent, because it was subject to Russell's paradox.

The inconsistency in Frege's Grundgesetze overshadowed Frege's achievement: according to Edward Zalta, the Grundgesetze "contains all the essential steps of a valid proof (in second-order logic) of the fundamental propositions of arithmetic from a single consistent principle." This achievement has become known as Frege's theorem.

== Frege's theorem in propositional logic ==
| ( | P | → | ( | Q | → | R | )) | → | (( | P | → | Q | ) | → | ( | P | → | R | )) |
|---|---|---|---|---|---|---|---|---|---|---|---|---|---|---|---|---|---|---|---|
| | No | ✓ | | No | ✓ | No | | ✓ | | ✗ | ✓ | ✗ | | ✓ | | ✗ | ✓ | ✗ |
| | No | ✓ | | No | ✓ | Yes | | ✓ | | ✗ | ✓ | ✗ | | ✓ | | ✗ | ✓ | ✓ |
| | No | ✓ | | Yes | ✗ | No | | ✓ | | ✗ | ✓ | ✓ | | ✓ | | ✗ | ✓ | ✗ |
| | No | ✓ | | Yes | ✓ | Yes | | ✓ | | ✗ | ✓ | ✓ | | ✓ | | ✗ | ✓ | ✓ |
| | Yes | ✓ | | No | ✓ | No | | ✓ | | ✓ | ✗ | ✗ | | ✓ | | ✓ | ✗ | ✗ |
| | Yes | ✓ | | No | ✓ | Yes | | ✓ | | ✓ | ✗ | ✗ | | ✓ | | ✓ | ✓ | ✓ |
| | Yes | ✗ | | Yes | ✗ | No | | ✓ | | ✓ | ✓ | ✓ | | ✗ | | ✓ | ✗ | ✗ |
| | Yes | ✓ | | Yes | ✓ | Yes | | ✓ | | ✓ | ✓ | ✓ | | ✓ | | ✓ | ✓ | ✓ |
| | 1 | 2 | | 3 | 4 | 5 | | 6 | | 7 | 8 | 9 | | 10 | | 11 | 12 | 13 |

In propositional logic, Frege's theorem refers to this tautology:

$$\big(P\to(Q\to R)\big)\to\big((P\to Q)\to(P\to R)\big)$$

The theorem already holds in one of the weakest logics imaginable, the constructive implicational calculus. The proof under the Brouwer–Heyting–Kolmogorov interpretation reads $f \mapsto g\mapsto p\mapsto (f(p)\circ g)(p)$. In words: "Let f denote a reason that P implies that Q implies R. And let g denote a reason that P implies Q. Then given a f, then given a g, then given a reason p for P, we know both that Q holds by g and that Q implies R holds by f. So R holds."

The truth table to the right gives a semantic proof. For all possible assignments of false (✗) or true (✓) to P, Q, and R (columns 1, 3, 5), each subformula is evaluated according to the rules for material conditional, the result being shown below its main operator. Column 6 shows that the whole formula evaluates to true in every case, i.e. that it is a tautology. In fact, its antecedent (column 2) and its consequent (column 10) are even equivalent.

=== Special cases ===
One commonly takes $\neg P$ to mean $P\to\bot$, where $\bot$ denotes a false proposition. With $\bot$ for $R$, the theorem entails the curried form of the negation introduction principle,
$$\big((P\to \neg Q\big)\land (P\to Q)\big) \to \neg P$$
