= Hume's principle =

Logical principle

In the foundations of mathematics, Hume's principle (or HP) says that, given two collections of objects $\mathcal F$ and $\mathcal G$ with properties $F$ and $G$ respectively, the number of objects with property $F$ is equal to the number of objects with property $G$ if and only if there is a one-to-one correspondence (a bijection) between $\mathcal F$ and $\mathcal G$. In other words, that bijections are the "correct" way of measuring size.

HP can be stated formally in systems of second-order logic. It is named for the Scottish philosopher David Hume and was coined by George Boolos. The principle plays a central role in Gottlob Frege's philosophy of mathematics. Frege shows that HP and suitable definitions of arithmetical notions entail all axioms of what we now call second-order arithmetic. This result is known as Frege's theorem, which is the foundation for a philosophy of mathematics known as neo-logicism.

== Origins ==
Hume's Principle appears in Frege's Foundations of Arithmetic (§63), which quotes from Part III of Book I of David Hume's A Treatise of Human Nature (1740).

In the treatise, Hume sets out seven fundamental relations between ideas, in particular concerning proportion in quantity or number. He argues that our reasoning about proportion in quantity, as represented by geometry, can never achieve "perfect precision and exactness", since its principles are derived from sense-appearance. He contrasts this with reasoning about number or arithmetic, in which such a precision can be attained:

Algebra and arithmetic [are] the only sciences in which we can carry on a chain of reasoning to any degree of intricacy, and yet preserve a perfect exactness and certainty. We are possessed of a precise standard, by which we can judge of the equality and proportion of numbers; and according as they correspond or not to that standard, we determine their relations, without any possibility of error. When two numbers are so combined, as that the one has always a unit answering to every unit of the other, we pronounce them equal; and it is for want of such a standard of equality in [spatial] extension, that geometry can scarce be esteemed a perfect and infallible science. (I. III. I.)

Note Hume's use of the word number in the ancient sense to mean a set or collection of things rather than the common modern notion of "positive integer". The ancient Greek notion of number (arithmos) is of a finite plurality composed of units. See Aristotle, Metaphysics, 1020a14 and Euclid, Elements, Book VII, Definition 1 and 2. The contrast between the old and modern conception of number is discussed in detail in Mayberry (2000).

== Influence on set theory ==
The principle that cardinal numbers were to be characterized in terms of one-to-one correspondence had previously been used by Georg Cantor, whose writings Frege knew. The suggestion has therefore been made that Hume's principle ought better be called "Cantor's Principle" or "The Hume–Cantor Principle". But Frege criticized Cantor on the ground that Cantor defines cardinal numbers in terms of ordinal numbers, whereas Frege wanted to give a characterization of cardinals that was independent of the ordinals. Cantor's point of view, however, is the one embedded in contemporary theories of transfinite numbers, as developed in axiomatic set theory.
