= Skolem normal form =

Formalism of first-order logic

In mathematical logic, a formula of first-order logic is in Skolem normal form if it is in prenex normal form with only universal first-order quantifiers.

Every first-order formula may be converted into Skolem normal form while not changing its satisfiability via a process called Skolemization (sometimes spelled Skolemnization). The resulting formula is not necessarily equivalent to the original one, but is equisatisfiable with it: it is satisfiable if and only if the original one is satisfiable.

Reduction to Skolem normal form is a method for removing existential quantifiers from formal logic statements, often performed as the first step in an automated theorem prover.

== Examples ==
The simplest form of Skolemization is for existentially quantified variables that are not inside the scope of a universal quantifier. These may be replaced simply by creating new constants. For example, $\exists x P(x)$ may be changed to $P(c)$, where $c$ is a new constant (does not occur anywhere else in the formula).

More generally, Skolemization is performed by replacing every existentially quantified variable $y$ with a term $f(x_1,\ldots,x_n)$ whose function symbol $f$ is new. The variables of this term are as follows. If the formula is in prenex normal form, then $x_1,\ldots,x_n$ are the variables that are universally quantified and whose quantifiers precede that of $y$. In general, they are the variables that are quantified universally (we assume we get rid of existential quantifiers in order, so all existential quantifiers before $\exists y$ have been removed) and such that $\exists y$ occurs in the scope of their quantifiers. The function $f$ introduced in this process is called a Skolem function (or Skolem constant if it is of zero arity) and the term is called a Skolem term.

As an example, the formula $\forall x \exists y \forall z P(x,y,z)$ is not in Skolem normal form because it contains the existential quantifier $\exists y$. Skolemization replaces $y$ with $f(x)$, where $f$ is a new function symbol, and removes the quantification over $y$. The resulting formula is $\forall x \forall z P(x,f(x),z)$. The Skolem term $f(x)$ contains $x$, but not $z$, because the quantifier to be removed $\exists y$ is in the scope of $\forall x$, but not in that of $\forall z$; since this formula is in prenex normal form, this is equivalent to saying that, in the list of quantifiers, $x$ precedes $y$ while $z$ does not. The formula obtained by this transformation is satisfiable if and only if the original formula is.

== How Skolemization works ==
Skolemization works by applying a second-order equivalence together with the definition of first-order satisfiability. The equivalence provides a way for "moving" an existential quantifier before a universal one.

$$\forall x   \exists y  R(x,y)  \iff \exists f \forall x  R(x,f(x))$$

where

$f(x)$ is a function that maps $x$ to $y$.

Intuitively, the sentence "for every $x$ there exists a $y$ such that $R(x,y)$" is converted into the equivalent form "there exists a function $f$ mapping every $x$ into a $y$ such that, for every $x$ it holds that $R(x,f(x))$".

This equivalence is useful because the definition of first-order satisfiability implicitly existentially quantifies over functions interpreting the function symbols. In particular, a first-order formula $\Phi$ is satisfiable if there exists a model $M$ and an evaluation $\mu$ of the free variables of the formula that evaluate the formula to true. The model contains the interpretation of all function symbols; therefore, Skolem functions are implicitly existentially quantified. In the example above, $\forall x R(x,f(x))$ is satisfiable if and only if there exists a model $M$, which contains an interpretation for $f$, such that $\forall x R(x,f(x))$ is true for some evaluation of its free variables (none in this case). This may be expressed in second order as $\exists f \forall x R(x,f(x))$. By the above equivalence, this is the same as the satisfiability of $\forall x \exists y R(x,y)$.

At the meta-level, first-order satisfiability of a formula $\Phi$ may be written with a little abuse of notation as $\exists M \exists \mu ( M,\mu \models \Phi)$, where $M$ is a model, $\mu$ is an evaluation of the free variables, and $\models$ means that $\Phi$ is true in $M$ under $\mu$. Since first-order models contain the interpretation of all function symbols, any Skolem function that $\Phi$ contains is implicitly existentially quantified by $\exists M$. As a result, after replacing existential quantifiers over variables by existential quantifiers over functions at the front of the formula, the formula still may be treated as a first-order one by removing these existential quantifiers. This final step of treating $\exists f \forall x R(x,f(x))$ as $\forall x R(x,f(x))$ may be completed because functions are implicitly existentially quantified by $\exists M$ in the definition of first-order satisfiability.

Correctness of Skolemization may be shown on the example formula $F_1 = \forall x_1 \dots \forall x_n \exists y R(x_1,\dots,x_n,y)$ as follows. This formula is satisfied by a model $M$ if and only if, for each possible value for $x_1,\dots,x_n$ in the domain of the model, there exists a value for $y$ in the domain of the model that makes $R(x_1,\dots,x_n,y)$ true. By the axiom of choice, there exists a function $f$ such that $y = f(x_1,\dots,x_n)$. As a result, the formula $F_2 = \forall x_1 \dots \forall x_n R(x_1,\dots,x_n,f(x_1,\dots,x_n))$ is satisfiable, because it has the model obtained by adding the interpretation of $f$ to $M$. This shows that $F_1$ is satisfiable only if $F_2$ is satisfiable as well. Conversely, if $F_2$ is satisfiable, then there exists a model $M'$ that satisfies it; this model includes an interpretation for the function $f$ such that, for every value of $x_1,\dots,x_n$, the formula $R(x_1,\dots,x_n,f(x_1,\dots,x_n))$ holds. As a result, $F_1$ is satisfied by the same model because one may choose, for every value of $x_1,\ldots,x_n$, the value $y=f(x_1,\dots,x_n)$, where $f$ is evaluated according to $M'$.

== Uses of Skolemization ==
One of the uses of Skolemization is within automated theorem proving. For example, in the method of analytic tableaux, whenever a formula whose leading quantifier is existential occurs, the formula obtained by removing that quantifier via Skolemization may be generated. For example, if $\exists x \Phi(x,y_1,\ldots,y_n)$ occurs in a tableau, where $x,y_1,\ldots,y_n$ are the free variables of $\Phi(x,y_1,\ldots,y_n)$, then $\Phi(f(y_1,\ldots,y_n),y_1,\ldots,y_n)$ may be added to the same branch of the tableau. This addition does not alter the satisfiability of the tableau: every model of the old formula may be extended, by adding a suitable interpretation of $f$, to a model of the new formula.

This form of Skolemization is an improvement over "classical" Skolemization in that only variables that are free in the formula are placed in the Skolem term. This is an improvement because the semantics of tableaux may implicitly place the formula in the scope of some universally quantified variables that are not in the formula itself; these variables are not in the Skolem term, while they would be there according to the original definition of Skolemization. Another improvement that may be used is applying the same Skolem function symbol for formulae that are identical up to variable renaming.

Another use is in the resolution method for first-order logic, where formulas are represented as sets of clauses understood to be universally quantified. (For an example see drinker paradox.)

An important result in model theory is the Löwenheim–Skolem theorem, which can be proven via Skolemizing the theory and closing under the resulting Skolem functions.

== Skolem theories ==
In general, if $T$ is a theory and for each formula with free variables $x_1, \dots, x_n, y$ there is an n-ary function symbol $F$ that is provably a Skolem function for $y$, then $T$ is called a Skolem theory.

Every Skolem theory is model complete, i.e. every substructure of a model is an elementary substructure. Given a model M of a Skolem theory T, the smallest substructure of M containing a certain set A is called the Skolem hull of A. The Skolem hull of A is an atomic prime model over A.

== History ==
Skolem normal form is named after the late Norwegian mathematician Thoralf Skolem.

== See also ==
- Herbrandization, the dual of Skolemization
- Predicate functor logic
