= W. D. Hart =

American philosopher (1943-2026)

Wilbur Dyre Hart III
- Born: February 18, 1943; Ithaca, New York
- Died: March 5, 2026 (aged 83); Mexico City, Mexico

Education
- Education: Harvard University (PhD)
- Thesis: Wittgenstein, Philosophy, Logic and Mathematics (1969)
- Doctoral advisor: Burton Dreben, Stanley Cavell

Philosophical work
- Era: 21st-century philosophy
- Region: Western philosophy
- School: Analytic
- Institutions: University of Illinois at Chicago
- Doctoral students: Ziya Movahed
- Main interests: Logic, philosophy of mathematics, metaphysics, and epistemology

Wilbur Dyre Hart (February 18, 1943 - March 5, 2026) was an American philosopher and professor emeritus of Philosophy at the University of Illinois at Chicago. He taught at the University of Michigan from 1969 to 1974, the University College London from 1974 to 1991, and the University of New Mexico from 1992 to 1993. Hart is known for his research on logic, philosophy of mathematics, metaphysics, and epistemology.

Hart defended substance dualism.

He died on March 5, 2026.

== Books ==
- The Engines of the Soul, Cambridge University Press, 1988
- The Evolution of Logic, Cambridge University Press, 2010
- Hart, W.D. (ed., 1996), The Philosophy of Mathematics, Oxford University Press

== See also ==
- Philosophical Essays on Freud
- Fitch's paradox of knowability
