= Ziya Movahed =

Iranian poet and professor in philosophy (born 1943)

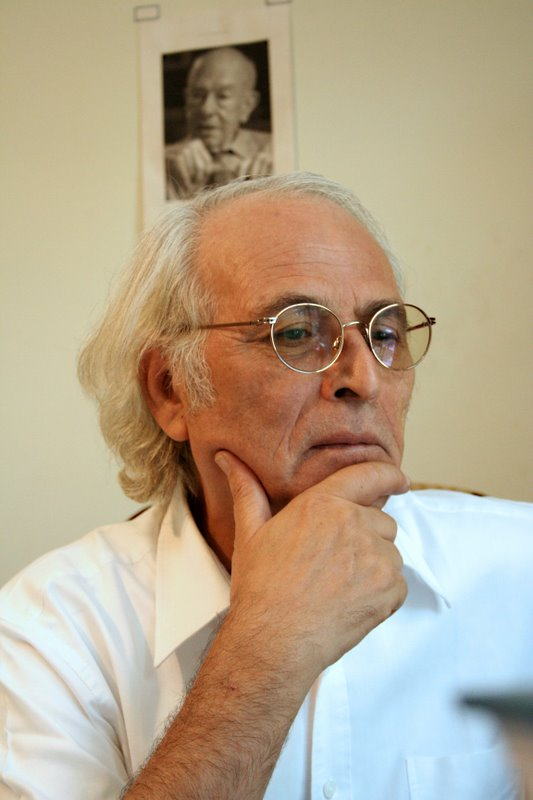
- Born: 2 January 1943 (age 83); Isfahan, Iran

Education
- Education: University College London (PhD)
- Thesis: Some Aspects of Frege's Philosophy of Logic (1982)
- Doctoral advisor: W. D. Hart

Philosophical work
- Era: 21st-century philosophy
- Region: Western philosophy
- School: Analytic
- Main interests: logic, philosophy of mathematics

Ziya Movahed (Persian: ضیاء موحد; born January 2, 1943) is an Iranian poet and professor in philosophy. He obtained a B.Sc. in Physics at University of Tehran and a Ph.D. in Philosophy at University College London.

== Critics on his works ==
- Critics on Movahed's poems by Hiva Massih
- Shakiba, Saeed, Critics on Movahed's poems

== Awards and honors ==
- Iran's book of the year award
