= Moore's paradox =

Philosophical paradox concerning seemingly-absurd assertions

Moore's paradox concerns the apparent absurdity involved in asserting a first-person present-tense sentence such as "It is raining, but I do not believe that it is raining" or "It is raining, but I believe that it is not raining." The first author to note this apparent absurdity was G. E. Moore. These "Moorean" sentences, as they have become known, are paradoxical in that while they appear absurd, they nevertheless

1. Can be true;
2. Are (logically) consistent; and
3. Are not (obviously) contradictions.

The term "Moore's paradox" is attributed to Ludwig Wittgenstein, who considered the paradox Moore's most important contribution to philosophy. Wittgenstein wrote about the paradox extensively in his later writings, (Note: See especially On Certainty and Philosophical Investigations.) which brought Moore's paradox the attention it would not have otherwise received.

Moore's paradox has been associated with many other well-known logical paradoxes, including, though not limited to, the liar paradox, the knower paradox, the unexpected hanging paradox, and the preface paradox.

There is currently not any generally accepted explanation of Moore's paradox in the philosophical literature. However, while Moore's paradox remains a philosophical curiosity, Moorean-type sentences are used by logicians, computer scientists, and those working with artificial intelligence as examples of cases in which a knowledge, belief, or information system is not modified in response to new data.

== The problem ==
Since Jaakko Hintikka's seminal treatment of the problem, it has become standard to present Moore's paradox by explaining why it is absurd to assert sentences that have the logical form: "P and NOT(I believe that P)" or "P and I believe that NOT-P." Philosophers refer to these, respectively, as the omissive and commissive versions of Moore's paradox.

Moore himself presented the problem in two versions.

The more fundamental manner of stating the problem starts from the three premises following:

1. It can be true at a particular time both that P, and that I do not believe that P.
2. I can assert or believe one of the two at a particular time.
3. It is absurd to assert or believe both of them at the same time.

I can assert that it is raining at a particular time. I can assert that I don't believe that it is raining at a particular time. If I say both at the same time, I am saying or doing something absurd. But the content of what I say—the proposition the sentence expresses—is perfectly consistent: it may well be raining, and I may not believe it. So why can I not assert that it is so?

Moore presents the problem in a second, distinct, way:

1. It is not absurd to assert the past-tense counterpart; e.g., "It was raining, but I did not believe that it was raining."
2. It is not absurd to assert the second- or third-person counterparts to Moore's sentences; e.g., "It is raining, but you do not believe that it is raining," or "Michael is dead, but they do not believe that he is."
3. It is absurd to assert the present-tense "It is raining, and I don't believe that it is raining."

I can assert that I was a certain way—e.g., believing it was raining when it wasn't—and that you, he, or they are that way but not that I am that way.

Subsequent philosophers have said that there is an apparent absurdity in asserting a first-person future-tense sentence such as "It will be raining, and I will believe that it is not raining."

== Proposed explanations ==
Philosophical interest in Moore's paradox, since Moore and Wittgenstein, has experienced a resurgence, starting with, though not limited to, Jaakko Hintikka, continuing with Roy Sorensen, David Rosenthal, Sydney Shoemaker and the first publication, in 2007, of a collection of articles devoted to the problem.

There have been several proposed constraints on a satisfactory explanation in the literature, including (though not limited to):

- It should explain the absurdity of both the omissive and the commissive versions.
- It should explain the absurdity of both asserting and believing Moore's sentences.
- It should preserve, and reveal the roots of, the intuition that contradiction (or something contradiction-like) is at the root of the absurdity.

The first two conditions have generally been the most challenged, while the third appears to be the least controversial. Some philosophers have claimed that there is, in fact, no problem in believing the content of Moore's sentences (e.g. David Rosenthal). Others (e.g. Sydney Shoemaker) claim that an explanation of the problem at the level of belief will automatically provide us with an explanation of the absurdity at the level of assertion via the linking principle that what can reasonably be asserted is determined by what can reasonably be believed. Some have also denied (e.g. Rosenthal) that a satisfactory explanation to the problem need be uniform in explaining both the omissive and commissive versions. Most of the explanations offered of Moore's paradox are united in claiming that contradiction is the basis of the absurdity.

One type of explanation at the level of assertion is that assertion implies or expresses belief in some way, so that if someone asserts that p they imply or express the belief that p. Several versions of this opinion exploit elements of speech act theory, which can be distinguished according to the particular explanation given of the link between assertion and belief. Whatever version of this opinion is preferred, whether cast in terms of the Gricean intentions (see Paul Grice) or in terms of the structure of Searlean illocutionary acts

An alternative position is that the assertion "I believe that p" often (though not always) functions as an alternative way of asserting "p", so that the semantic content of the assertion "I believe that p" is just p: it functions as a statement about the world and not about anyone's state of mind. Accordingly, what someone asserts when they assert "p and I believe that not-p" is just "p and not-p" Asserting the commissive version of Moore's sentences is again assimilated to the more familiar (putative) impropriety of asserting a contradiction.

Another alternative opinion, due to Richard Moran, considering the existence of Moore's paradox as symptomatic of creatures who are capable of self-knowledge, capable of thinking for themselves from a deliberative point of view, as well as about themselves from a theoretical point of view. On this view, anyone who asserted or believed one of Moore's sentences would be subject to a loss of self-knowledge—in particular, would be one who, with respect to a particular 'object', broadly construed, e.g. person, apple, the way of the world, would be in a situation which violates, what Moran calls, the Transparency Condition: if I want to know what I think about X, then I consider/think about nothing but X itself. Moran's opinion seems to be that what makes Moore's paradox so distinctive is not some contradictory-like phenomenon (or at least not in the sense that most commentators on the problem have construed it), whether it be located at the level of belief or that of assertion. Rather, that the very possibility of Moore's paradox is a consequence of our status as agents (albeit finite and resource-limited ones) who are capable of knowing (and changing) their own minds.

== See also ==
- Belief
- Consistency
- Doublethink
- Doubt
- Doxastic logic
- Epistemology
- Contradiction
- Irrationality
- List of paradoxes
- Philosophy of mind
- Rationality
- Self-knowledge (psychology)
- Self-deception
