= Modal operator =

Logical operator in modal logic

A modal connective (or modal operator) is a logical connective for modal logic. It is an operator which forms propositions from propositions. In general, a modal operator has the "formal" property of being non-truth-functional in the following sense: The truth-value of composite formulae sometimes depend on factors other than the actual truth-value of their components. In the case of alethic modal logic, a modal operator can be said to be truth-functional in another sense, namely, that of being sensitive only to the distribution of truth-values across possible worlds, actual or not. Finally, a modal operator is "intuitively" characterized by expressing a modal attitude (such as necessity, possibility, belief, or knowledge) about the proposition to which the operator is applied.

== Syntax for modal operators ==
The syntax rules for modal operators $\Box$ and $\Diamond$ are very similar to those for universal and existential quantifiers; In fact, any formula with modal operators $\Box$ and $\Diamond$, and the usual logical connectives in propositional calculus ($\land,\lor,\neg,\rightarrow,\leftrightarrow$) can be rewritten to a de dicto normal form, similar to prenex normal form. One major caveat: Whereas the universal and existential quantifiers only binds to the propositional variables or the predicate variables following the quantifiers, since the modal operators $\Box$ and $\Diamond$ quantifies over accessible possible worlds, they will bind to any formula in their scope. For example, $(\exists x (x^2 = 1)) \land (0 = y)$ is logically equivalent to $\exists x (x^2 = 1\land 0 = y)$, but $(\Diamond (x^2 = 1)) \land (0 = y)$ is not logically equivalent to $\Diamond (x^2 = 1\land 0 = y)$; Instead, $\Diamond (x^2 = 1\land 0 = y)$ logically entails $(\Diamond (x^2 = 1)) \land \Diamond(0 = y)$.

When there are both modal operators and quantifiers in a formula, different order of an adjacent pair of modal operator and quantifier can lead to different semantic meanings. Also, when multimodal logic is involved, different order of an adjacent pair of modal operators can also lead to different semantic meanings.

== Modality interpreted ==
There are several ways to interpret modal operators in modal logic, including at least: alethic, deontic, axiological, epistemic, and doxastic.

=== Alethic ===
Alethic modal operators (M-operators) determine the fundamental conditions of possible worlds, especially causality, time-space parameters, and the action capacity of persons. They indicate the possibility, impossibility and necessity of actions, states of affairs, events, people, and qualities in the possible worlds.

=== Deontic ===
Deontic modal operators (P-operators) influence the construction of possible worlds as proscriptive or prescriptive norms, i.e. they indicate what is prohibited, obligatory, or permitted.

=== Axiological ===
Axiological modal operators (G-operators) transform the world's entities into values and disvalues as seen by a social group, a culture, or a historical period. Axiological modalities are highly subjective categories: what is good for one person may be considered as bad by another one.

=== Epistemic ===
Epistemic modal operators (K-operators) reflect the level of knowledge, ignorance and belief in the possible world.

=== Doxastic ===
Doxastic modal operators express belief in statements.

=== Boulomaic ===
Boulomaic modal operators express desire.
