= Knower paradox =

Self-reference paradox

The knower paradox is a paradox belonging to the family of the paradoxes of self-reference (like the liar paradox). Informally, it consists in considering a sentence saying of itself that it is not known, and apparently deriving the contradiction that such sentence is both not known and known.

Example: "The truth of this sentence is not known."

== History ==
A version of the paradox occurs already in chapter 9 of Thomas Bradwardine’s Insolubilia. In the wake of the modern discussion of the paradoxes of self-reference, the paradox has been rediscovered (and dubbed with its current name) by the US logicians and philosophers David Kaplan and Richard Montague, and is now considered an important paradox in the area. The paradox bears connections with other epistemic paradoxes such as the hangman paradox and the paradox of knowability.

== Formulation ==
The notion of knowledge seems to be governed by the principle that knowledge is factive:

(KF): If the sentence ' P ' is known, then P

(where we use single quotes to refer to the linguistic expression inside the quotes and where 'is known' is short for 'is known by someone at some time'). It also seems to be governed by the principle that proof yields knowledge:

(PK): If the sentence ' P ' has been proved, then ' P ' is known

Consider however the sentence:

(K): (K) is not known

Assume for reductio ad absurdum that (K) is known. Then, by (KF), (K) is not known, and so, by reductio ad absurdum, we can conclude that (K) is not known. Now, this conclusion, which is the sentence (K) itself, depends on no undischarged assumptions, and so has just been proved. Therefore, by (PK), we can further conclude that (K) is known. Putting the two conclusions together, we have the contradiction that (K) is both not known and known.

== Solutions ==
Since, given the diagonal lemma, every sufficiently strong theory will have to accept something like (K), absurdity can only be avoided either by rejecting one of the two principles of knowledge (KF) and (PK) or by rejecting classical logic (which validates the reasoning from (KF) and (PK) to absurdity). The first kind of strategy subdivides in several alternatives. One approach takes its inspiration from the hierarchy of truth predicates familiar from Alfred Tarski's work on the Liar paradox and constructs a similar hierarchy of knowledge predicates. Another approach upholds a single knowledge predicate but takes the paradox to call into doubt either the unrestricted validity of (PK) or at least knowledge of (KF). The second kind of strategy also subdivides in several alternatives. One approach rejects the law of excluded middle and consequently reductio ad absurdum. Another approach upholds reductio ad absurdum and thus accepts the conclusion that (K) is both not known and known, thereby rejecting the law of non-contradiction.
