= Scope (logic) =

Range of application for a quantifier or connective in a logical formula

In logic, the scope of a quantifier or connective is the shortest formula in which it occurs, determining the range in the formula to which the quantifier or connective is applied. The notions of a free variable and bound variable are defined in terms of whether that formula is within the scope of a quantifier, and the notions of a dominant connective and subordinate connective are defined in terms of whether a connective includes another within its scope.

== Connectives ==
The scope of a logical connective occurring within a formula is the smallest well-formed formula that contains the connective in question. The connective with the largest scope in a formula is called its dominant connective, main connective, main operator, major connective, or principal connective; a connective within the scope of another connective is said to be subordinate to it.

For instance, in the formula $(\left( \left( P \rightarrow Q \right) \lor \lnot Q \right) \leftrightarrow \left( \lnot \lnot P \land Q \right))$, the dominant connective is ↔, and all other connectives are subordinate to it; the → is subordinate to the ∨, but not to the ∧; the first ¬ is also subordinate to the ∨, but not to the →; the second ¬ is subordinate to the ∧, but not to the ∨ or the →; and the third ¬ is subordinate to the second ¬, as well as to the ∧, but not to the ∨ or the →. If an order of precedence is adopted for the connectives, viz., with ¬ applying first, then ∧ and ∨, then →, and finally ↔, this formula may be written in the less parenthesized form $\left ( P \rightarrow Q \right) \lor \lnot Q \leftrightarrow \lnot \lnot P \land Q$, which some may find easier to read.

== Quantifiers ==
The scope of a quantifier is the part of a logical expression over which the quantifier exerts control. It is the shortest full sentence written right after the quantifier, often in parentheses; some authors describe this as including the variable written right after the universal or existential quantifier. In the formula ∀xP, for example, P (or xP) is the scope of the quantifier ∀x (or ∀).

This gives rise to the following definitions: (Note: These definitions follow the common practice of using Greek letters as metalogical symbols which may stand for symbols in a formal language for propositional or predicate logic. In particular, $\phi$ and $\psi$ are used to stand for any formulae whatsoever, whereas $\xi$ and $\zeta$ are used to stand for propositional variables.)

- An occurrence of a quantifier $\forall$ or $\exists$, immediately followed by an occurrence of the variable $\xi$, as in $\forall \xi$ or $\exists \xi$, is said to be $\xi$-binding.
- An occurrence of a variable $\xi$ in a formula $\phi$ is free in $\phi$ if, and only if, it is not in the scope of any $\xi$-binding quantifier in $\phi$; otherwise it is bound in $\phi$.
- A closed formula is one in which no variable occurs free; a formula which is not closed is open.
- An occurrence of a quantifier $\forall \xi$ or $\exists \xi$ is vacuous if, and only if, its scope is $\forall \xi \psi$ or $\exists \xi \psi$, and the variable $\xi$ does not occur free in $\psi$.
- A variable $\zeta$ is free for a variable $\xi$ if, and only if, no free occurrences of $\xi$ lie within the scope of a quantification on $\zeta$.
- A quantifier whose scope contains another quantifier is said to have wider scope than the second, which, in turn, is said to have narrower scope than the first.

== See also ==
- Modal scope fallacy
- Prenex form
- Glossary of logic
- Free variables and bound variables
- Open formula
