= Strength (mathematical logic) =

Concept in model theory

The relative strength of two systems of formal logic can be defined via model theory. Specifically, a logic $\alpha$ is said to be as strong as a logic $\beta$ if every elementary class in $\beta$ is an elementary class in $\alpha$.

== See also ==
- Abstract logic
- Lindström's theorem
