= Conditional quantifier =

Kind of quantifier in logic

In logic, a conditional quantifier is a kind of Lindström quantifier (or generalized quantifier) Q_{A} that, relative to a classical model A, satisfies some or all of the following conditions ("X" and "Y" range over arbitrary formulas in one free variable):

		Q_{A} X X	[reflexivity]
Q_{A} X Y	⇒	Q_{A} X (Y∧X)	[right conservativity]
Q_{A} X (Y∧X)	⇒	Q_{A} X Y	[left conservativity]
Q_{A} X Y	⇒	Q_{A} X (Y∨Z)	[positive confirmation]
Q_{A} X (Y∧Z)	⇒	Q_{A} (X∧Y) Z
Q_{A} X Y	⇒	Q_{A} (X∨Z) (Y∨Z)	[positive and negative confirmation]
Q_{A} X Y	⇒	Q_{A} (¬X) (¬Y)	[contraposition]
Q_{A} X Y ∧ Q_{A} Y Z	⇒	Q_{A} X Z	[transitivity]
Q_{A} X Y	⇒	Q_{A} (X∧Z) Y	[weakening]
Q_{A} X Y ∧ Q_{A} X Z	⇒	Q_{A} X (Y∧Z)	[conjunction]
Q_{A} X Z ∧ Q_{A} Y Z	⇒	Q_{A} (X∨Y) Z	[disjunction]
Q_{A} X Y	⇒	Q_{A} Y X	[symmetry].

(The implication arrow denotes material implication in the metalanguage.) The minimal conditional logic M is characterized by the first six properties, and stronger conditional logics include some of the other ones. For example, the quantifier ∀_{A}, which can be viewed as set-theoretic inclusion, satisfies all of the above except [symmetry]. Clearly [symmetry] holds for ∃_{A} while e.g. [contraposition] fails.

A semantic interpretation of conditional quantifiers involves a relation between sets of subsets of a given structure—i.e. a relation between properties defined on the structure. Some of the details can be found in the article Lindström quantifier.

Conditional quantifiers are meant to capture certain properties concerning conditional reasoning at an abstract level. Generally, it is intended to clarify the role of conditionals in a first-order language as they relate to other connectives, such as conjunction or disjunction. While they can cover nested conditionals, the greater complexity of the formula, specifically the greater the number of conditional nesting, the less helpful they are as a methodological tool for understanding conditionals, at least in some sense. Compare this methodological strategy for conditionals with that of first-degree entailment logics.
