= Non-standard model =

Model in mathematical logic not isomorphic to the standard model

In model theory, a discipline within mathematical logic, a non-standard model is a model of a theory that is not isomorphic to the intended model (or standard model).

== Existence ==
If the intended model is infinite and the language is first-order, then the Löwenheim–Skolem theorems guarantee the existence of non-standard models. The non-standard models can be chosen as elementary extensions or elementary substructures of the intended model.

== Importance ==
Non-standard models are studied in set theory, non-standard analysis and non-standard models of arithmetic.

== See also ==
- Interpretation (logic)
