= Abstract logic =

Formal system in mathematical logic

In mathematical logic, an abstract logic is a formal system consisting of a class of sentences and a satisfaction relation with specific properties related to occurrence, expansion, isomorphism, renaming and quantification.

Based on Lindström's characterization, first-order logic is, up to equivalence, the only abstract logic that is countably compact and has Löwenheim number ω.

== See also ==
- Abstract algebraic logic – Study of the algebraization of deductive systems, based on the Lindenbaum–Tarski algebra
- Abstract model theory
- Löwenheim number – Smallest cardinal number for which a weak downward Löwenheim–Skolem theorem holds
- Lindström's theorem – Theorem in mathematical logic
- Universal logic – Subfield of logic that studies the features common to all logical systems
