= Counting quantification =

Mathematical logical term

A counting quantifier is a mathematical term for a quantifier of the form "there exists at least k elements that satisfy property X". In first-order logic with equality, counting quantifiers can be defined in terms of ordinary quantifiers, so in this context they are a notational shorthand. However, they are interesting in the context of logics such as two-variable logic with counting that restrict the number of variables in formulas. Also, generalized counting quantifiers that say "there exists infinitely many" are not expressible using a finite number of formulas in first-order logic.

== Definition in terms of ordinary quantifiers ==
Counting quantifiers can be defined recursively in terms of ordinary quantifiers.

Let $\exists_{= k}$ denote "there exist exactly $k$". Then

$$\begin{align}
\exists_{= 0} x P x &\leftrightarrow \neg \exists x P x \\
\exists_{= k+1} x P x &\leftrightarrow \exists x (P x \land \exists_{= k} y (P y \land y \neq x))
\end{align}$$

Let $\exists_{\geq k}$ denote "there exist at least $k$". Then

$$\begin{align}
\exists_{\geq 0} x P x &\leftrightarrow \top \\
\exists_{\geq k+1} x P x &\leftrightarrow \exists x (P x \land \exists_{\geq k} y (P y \land y \neq x))
\end{align}$$

== See also ==
- Uniqueness quantification
- Lindström quantifier
- Spectrum of a sentence
