= Abstract model theory =

In mathematical logic, abstract model theory is a generalization of model theory that studies the general properties of extensions of first-order logic and their models.

Abstract model theory provides an approach that allows one to "step back" and study a wide range of logics and their relationships. The starting point for the study of abstract models, which resulted in good examples was Lindström's theorem.

In 1974 Jon Barwise provided an axiomatization of abstract model theory.

== See also ==
- Lindström's theorem
- Institution (computer science)
- Institutional model theory
