= Quantifier shift =

Logical fallacy

A quantifier shift is a logical fallacy in which the quantifiers of a statement are erroneously transposed during the rewriting process. The change in the logical nature of the statement may not be obvious when it is stated in a natural language like English.

== Definition ==
The fallacious deduction is that: For every A, there is a B, such that C. Therefore, there is a B, such that for every A, C.

$$\forall x \,\exists y \,Rxy \vdash \exists y \,\forall x \,Rxy$$

However, an inverse switching:

$$\exist y \,\forall x \,Rxy  \vdash  \forall x \,\exist y\, Rxy$$

is logically valid.

== Examples ==
1. Every person has a woman that is their mother. Therefore, there is a woman that is the mother of every person.

$$\forall x \,\exists y \,(Px \to (Wy \land M(yx))) \vdash \exists y \,\forall x \,(Px \to (Wy \land M(yx)))$$

It is fallacious to conclude that there is one woman who is the mother of all people.

However, if the major premise ("every person has a woman that is their mother") is assumed to be true, then it is valid to conclude that there is some woman who is any given person's mother.

2. Everybody has something to believe in. Therefore, there is something that everybody believes in.

$$\forall x \,\exists y \,Bxy \vdash \exists y \,\forall x \,Bxy$$

It is fallacious to conclude that there is some particular concept to which everyone subscribes.

It is valid to conclude that each person believes a given concept. But it is entirely possible that each person believes in a unique concept.

3. Every natural number $n$ has a successor $m = n + 1$, the smallest of all natural numbers that are greater than $n$. Therefore, there is a natural number ${m}$ that is a successor to all natural numbers.

$$\forall n \,\exists m \,Snm \vdash \exists m \,\forall n \,Snm$$

It is fallacious to conclude that there is a single natural number that is the successor of every natural number.
