= Lindström's theorem =

Theorem in mathematical logic

In mathematical logic, Lindström's theorem (named after Swedish logician Per Lindström, who published it in 1969) states that first-order logic is the strongest logic (satisfying certain conditions, e.g. closure under classical negation) having both the (countable) compactness property and the (downward) Löwenheim–Skolem property.

Lindström's theorem is perhaps the best known result of what later became known as abstract model theory, the basic notion of which is an abstract logic; the more general notion of an institution was later introduced, which advances from a set-theoretical notion of model to a category-theoretical one. Lindström had previously obtained a similar result in studying first-order logics extended with Lindström quantifiers.

Lindström's theorem has been extended to various other systems of logic, in particular modal logics by Johan van Benthem and Sebastian Enqvist.
