= Leopold Löwenheim =

German mathematician

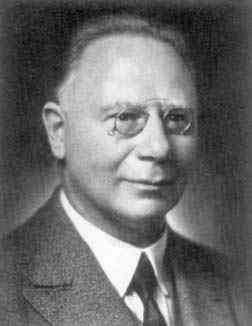
- Born: 26 June 1878; Krefeld, Germany
- Died: 5 May 1957 (aged 78); Berlin, Germany
- Education: University of Berlin, Technische Universität Berlin
- Known for: Löwenheim–Skolem theorem
- Spouse: Johanna Rassmussen
- Scientific career
- Fields: Mathematical logic

Leopold Löwenheim [ˈle:o:pɔl̩d ˈlø:vɛnhaɪm] (26 June 1878 in Krefeld – 5 May 1957 in Berlin) was a German mathematician doing work in mathematical logic. The Nazi regime forced him to retire because under the Nuremberg Laws he was considered only three quarters Aryan. In 1943 much of his work was destroyed during a bombing raid on Berlin. Nevertheless, he survived the Second World War, after which he resumed teaching mathematics.

Löwenheim (1915) gave the first proof of what is now known as the Löwenheim–Skolem theorem, often considered the starting point for model theory.

Leopold was the son of Ludwig Löwenheim, a mathematics teacher at the polytechnic in Krefeld and Elizabeth Röhn, a writer. In 1881 the three of them left Krefeld first for Naples and then Berlin where Ludwig was a private scholar working on a comprehensive account of the influence of Democritus on modern science. Although he hoped this would gain him a teaching job at Humboldt University Ludwig died in 1894.

== Publications ==
- Löwenheim, Leopold (1908). "Über das Auflösungsproblem im logischen Klassenkalkül". Sitzungsberichte der Berliner Mathematischen Gesellschaft (in German). 7: 89–94.
- Löwenheim, Leopold (1910). "Über die Auflösung von Gleichungen im logischen Gebietekalkül" (PDF). Mathematische Annalen (in German). 68 (2): 169–207. doi:10.1007/bf01474159. S2CID 122434845.
- Löwenheim, Leopold (1913). "Über Transformationen im Gebietekalkül" (PDF). Mathematische Annalen (in German). 73 (2): 245–272. doi:10.1007/bf01456715. S2CID 120979593.
- Löwenheim, Leopold (1915). "Über Möglichkeiten im Relativkalkül" (PDF). Mathematische Annalen (in German). 76 (4): 447–470. doi:10.1007/bf01458217. S2CID 116581304. Translated as "On possibilities in the calculus of relatives" in Jean van Heijenoort, 1967. A Source Book in Mathematical Logic, 1879–1931. Harvard Univ. Press: 228–251.
- Löwenheim, Leopold (1915). "Über eine Erweiterung des Gebietekalküls, welche auch die gewöhnliche Algebra umfaßt". Archiv für Systematische Philosophie (in German). 21: 137–148.
- Löwenheim, Leopold (1940). "Einkleidung der Mathematik in Schröderschen Relativkalkül". Journal of Symbolic Logic (in German). 5 (1): 1–15. doi:10.2307/2269177. JSTOR 2269177. S2CID 250344187.
- Löwenheim, Leopold (1946). "On Making Indirect Proofs Direct". Scripta Mathematica. 12 (2). Translated by Willard Van Orman Quine: 125–147.
