= Per Lindström =

Swedish logician (1936–2009)

Per "Pelle" Lindström (9 April 1936 – 21 August 2009, Gothenburg) was a Swedish logician, after whom Lindström's theorem and the Lindström quantifier are named. (He also independently discovered Ehrenfeucht–Fraïssé games.) He was one of the key followers of Lars Svenonius.

Lindström was awarded a PhD from the University of Gothenburg in 1966. His thesis was titled Some Results in the Theory of Models of First Order Languages. A festschrift for Lindström was published in 1986.

== Selected publications ==
- Per Lindström, First Order Predicate Logic with Generalized Quantifiers, Theoria 32, 1966, 186–195.
- Per Lindström, On Extensions of Elementary Logic, Theoria 35, 1969, 1–11.
- Per Lindström (1997). Aspects of incompleteness. Springer-Verlag. ISBN 978-3-540-63213-9.; 2nd ed. published by ASL in 2003, ISBN 978-1-56881-173-4
