= Cantor's first set theory article =

First article on transfinite set theory

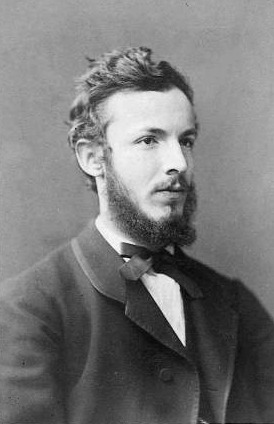
Georg Cantor, c. 1870

Cantor's first set theory article contains Georg Cantor's first theorems of transfinite set theory, which studies infinite sets and their properties. One of these theorems is his "revolutionary discovery" that the set of all real numbers is uncountably, rather than countably, infinite. This theorem is proved using Cantor's first uncountability proof, which differs from the more familiar proof using his diagonal argument. The title of the article, "On a Property of the Collection of All Real Algebraic Numbers" ("Ueber eine Eigenschaft des Inbegriffes aller reellen algebraischen Zahlen"), refers to its first theorem: the set of real algebraic numbers is countable. Cantor's article was published in 1874. In 1879, he modified his uncountability proof by using the topological notion of a set being dense in an interval.

Cantor's article also contains a proof of the existence of transcendental numbers. Both constructive and non-constructive proofs have been presented as "Cantor's proof." The popularity of presenting a non-constructive proof has led to a misconception that Cantor's arguments are non-constructive. Since the proof that Cantor published either constructs transcendental numbers or does not, an analysis of his article can determine whether or not this proof is constructive. Cantor's correspondence with Richard Dedekind shows the development of his ideas and reveals that he had a choice between two proofs: a non-constructive proof that uses the uncountability of the real numbers and a constructive proof that does not use uncountability.

Historians of mathematics have examined Cantor's article and the circumstances in which it was written. For example, they have discovered that Cantor was advised to leave out his uncountability theorem in the article he submitted — he added it during proofreading. They have traced this and other facts about the article to the influence of Karl Weierstrass and Leopold Kronecker. Historians have also studied Dedekind's contributions to the article, including his contributions to the theorem on the countability of the real algebraic numbers. In addition, they have recognized the role played by the uncountability theorem and the concept of countability in the development of set theory, measure theory, and the Lebesgue integral.

== The article ==
Cantor's article is short, less than four and a half pages. (Note: In letter to Dedekind dated December 25, 1873, Cantor states that he has written and submitted "a short paper" titled On a Property of the Set of All Real Algebraic Numbers. (Noether & Cavaillès 1937, p. 17; English translation: Ewald 1996, p. 847.)) It begins with a discussion of the real algebraic numbers and a statement of his first theorem: The set of real algebraic numbers can be put into one-to-one correspondence with the set of positive integers. Cantor restates this theorem in terms more familiar to mathematicians of his time: "The set of real algebraic numbers can be written as an infinite sequence in which each number appears only once."

Cantor's second theorem works with a closed interval [a, b], which is the set of real numbers ≥ a and ≤ b. The theorem states: Given any sequence of real numbers x_{1}, x_{2}, x_{3}, ... and any interval [a, b], there is a number in [a, b] that is not contained in the given sequence. Hence, there are infinitely many such numbers.

Cantor observes that combining his two theorems yields a new proof of Liouville's theorem that every interval [a, b] contains infinitely many transcendental numbers.

Cantor then remarks that his second theorem is:

the reason why collections of real numbers forming a so-called continuum (such as, all real numbers which are ≥ 0 and ≤ 1) cannot correspond one-to-one with the collection (ν) [the collection of all positive integers]; thus I have found the clear difference between a so-called continuum and a collection like the totality of real algebraic numbers.

This remark contains Cantor's uncountability theorem, which only states that an interval [a, b] cannot be put into one-to-one correspondence with the set of positive integers. It does not state that this interval is an infinite set of larger cardinality than the set of positive integers. Cardinality is defined in Cantor's next article, which was published in 1878.

Proof of Cantor's uncountability theorem
Cantor does not explicitly prove his uncountability theorem, which follows easily from his second theorem. It can be proved by using proof by contradiction. Assume that the interval [a, b] can be put into one-to-one correspondence with the set of positive integers, or equivalently: The real numbers in [a, b] can be written as a sequence in which each real number appears only once. Applying Cantor's second theorem to this sequence and [a, b] produces a real number in [a, b] that does not belong to the sequence. This contradicts the original assumption and proves the uncountability theorem.

Cantor only states his uncountability theorem. He does not use it in any proofs.

== The proofs ==
=== First theorem ===
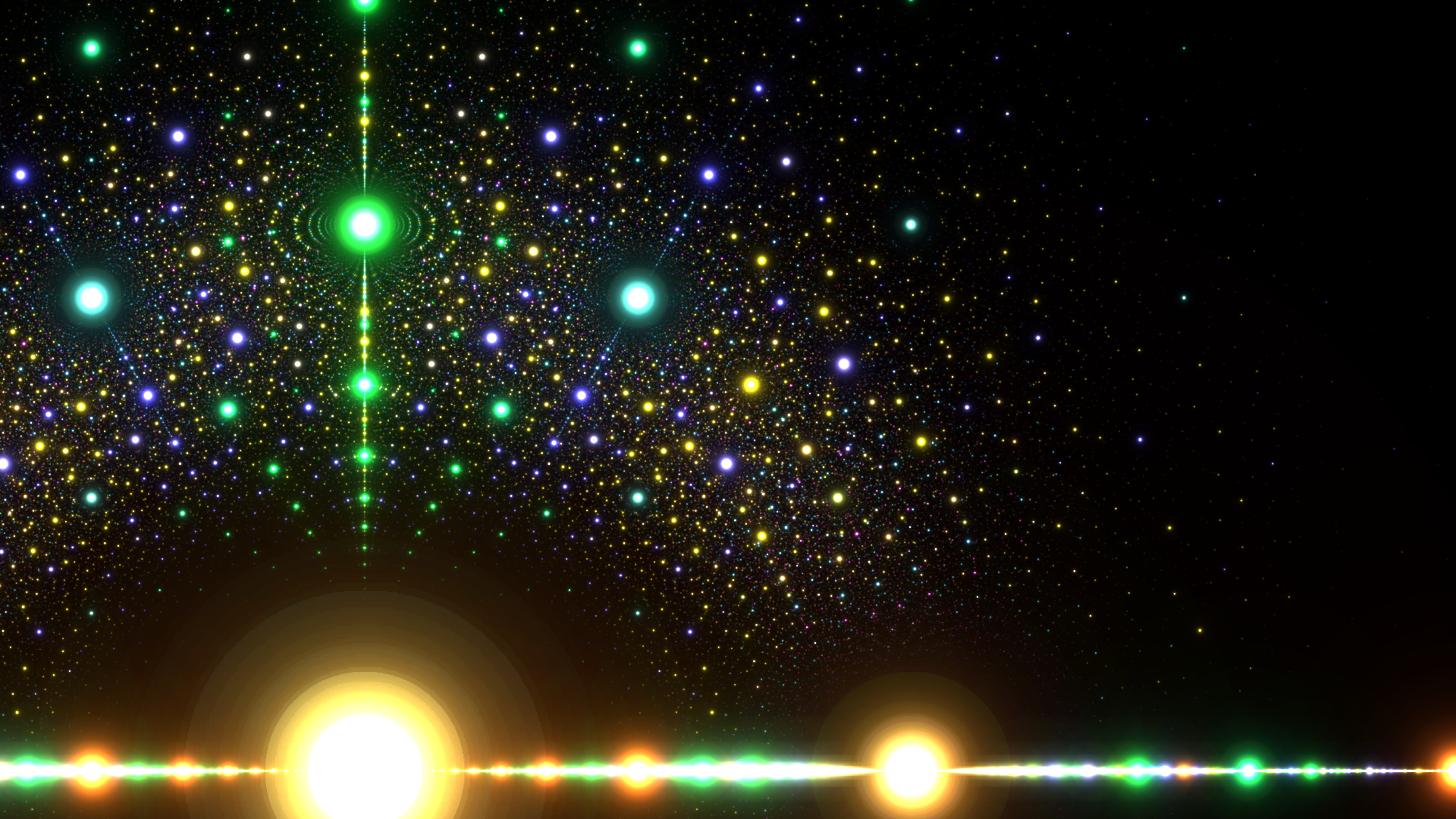
Algebraic numbers on the complex plane colored by polynomial degree. (red = 1, green = 2, blue = 3, yellow = 4). Points become smaller as the integer polynomial coefficients become larger.

To prove that the set of real algebraic numbers is countable, define the height of a polynomial of degree n with integer coefficients as: n − 1 + |a_{0}| + |a_{1}| + ... + |a_{n}|, where a_{0}, a_{1}, ..., a_{n} are the coefficients of the polynomial. Order the polynomials by their height, and order the real roots of polynomials of the same height by numeric order. Since there are only a finite number of roots of polynomials of a given height, these orderings put the real algebraic numbers into a sequence. Cantor went a step further and produced a sequence in which each real algebraic number appears just once. He did this by only using polynomials that are irreducible over the integers. The following table contains the beginning of Cantor's enumeration.

Cantor's enumeration of the real algebraic numbers
Real algebraic number	Polynomial	Height of polynomial
x_{1} = 0	x	1
x_{2} = −1	x + 1	2
x_{3} = 1	x − 1	2
x_{4} = −2	x + 2	3
x_{5} = −1/2	2x + 1	3
x_{6} = 1/2	2x − 1	3
x_{7} = 2	x − 2	3
x_{8} = −3	x + 3	4
x_{9} = (−1 − √5)/2	x^{2} + x − 1	4
x_{10} = −√2	x^{2} − 2	4
x_{11} = −1/√2	2x^{2} − 1	4
x_{12} = (1 − √5)/2	x^{2} − x − 1	4
x_{13} = −1/3	3x + 1	4
x_{14} = 1/3	3x − 1	4
x_{15} = (−1 + √5)/2	x^{2} + x − 1	4
x_{16} = 1/√2	2x^{2} − 1	4
x_{17} = √2	x^{2} − 2	4
x_{18} = (1 + √5)/2	x^{2} − x − 1	4
x_{19} = 3	x − 3	4

=== Second theorem ===
Only the first part of Cantor's second theorem needs to be proved. It states: Given any sequence of real numbers x_{1}, x_{2}, x_{3}, ... and any interval [a, b], there is a number in [a, b] that is not contained in the given sequence. (Note: This implies the rest of the theorem — namely, there are infinitely many numbers in [a, b] that are not contained in the given sequence. For example, let $[0,1]$ be the interval and consider its subintervals $[0, \tfrac{1}{2}],$ $[\tfrac{3}{4},\tfrac{7}{8}],$ $[\tfrac{15}{16}, \tfrac{31}{32}],$ $\ldots.$ Since these subintervals are pairwise disjoint, applying the first part of the theorem to each subinterval produces infinitely many numbers in $[0,1]$ that are not contained in the given sequence. In general, for the interval $[a, b],$ apply the first part of the theorem to the subintervals $[a, a + \tfrac{1}{2}(b-a)],$ $[a + \tfrac{3}{4}(b-a), a + \tfrac{7}{8}(b-a)],$ $[a + \tfrac{15}{16}(b-a), a + \tfrac{31}{32}(b-a)],$ $\ldots .$)

To find a number in [a, b] that is not contained in the given sequence, construct two sequences of real numbers as follows: Find the first two numbers of the given sequence that are in the open interval (a, b). Denote the smaller of these two numbers by a_{1} and the larger by b_{1}. Similarly, find the first two numbers of the given sequence that are in (a_{1}, b_{1}). Denote the smaller by a_{2} and the larger by b_{2}. Continuing this procedure generates a sequence of intervals (a_{1}, b_{1}), (a_{2}, b_{2}), (a_{3}, b_{3}), ... such that each interval in the sequence contains all succeeding intervals — that is, it generates a sequence of nested intervals. This implies that the sequence a_{1}, a_{2}, a_{3}, ... is increasing and the sequence b_{1}, b_{2}, b_{3}, ... is decreasing.

Either the number of intervals generated is finite or infinite. If finite, let (a_{L}, b_{L}) be the last interval. If infinite, take the limits a_{∞} = lim_{n → ∞} a_{n} and b_{∞} = lim_{n → ∞} b_{n}. Since a_{n} < b_{n} for all n, either a_{∞} = b_{∞} or a_{∞} < b_{∞}. Thus, there are three cases to consider:

Case 1: Last interval (a_{L}, b_{L})

Case 1: There is a last interval (a_{L}, b_{L}). Since at most one x_{n} can be in this interval, every y in this interval except x_{n} (if it exists) is not in the given sequence.

Case 2: a_{∞} = b_{∞}

Case 2: a_{∞} = b_{∞}. Then a_{∞} is not in the sequence since for all n : a_{∞} is in the interval (a_{n}, b_{n}) but x_{n} does not belong to (a_{n}, b_{n}). In symbols: a_{∞} ∈ (a_{n}, b_{n}) but x_{n} ∉ (a_{n}, b_{n}).

Proof that for all n : x_{n} ∉ (a_{n}, b_{n})
This lemma is used by cases 2 and 3. It is implied by the stronger lemma: For all n, (a_{n}, b_{n}) excludes x_{1}, ..., x_{2n}. This is proved by induction. Basis step: Since the endpoints of (a_{1}, b_{1}) are x_{1} and x_{2} and an open interval excludes its endpoints, (a_{1}, b_{1}) excludes x_{1}, x_{2}. Inductive step: Assume that (a_{n}, b_{n}) excludes x_{1}, ..., x_{2n}. Since (a_{n+1}, b_{n+1}) is a subset of (a_{n}, b_{n}) and its endpoints are x_{2n+1} and x_{2n+2}, (a_{n+1}, b_{n+1}) excludes x_{1}, ..., x_{2n} and x_{2n+1}, x_{2n+2}. Hence, for all n, (a_{n}, b_{n}) excludes x_{1}, ..., x_{2n}. Therefore, for all n, x_{n} ∉ (a_{n}, b_{n}). (Note: Cantor does not prove this lemma. In a footnote for case 2, he states that x_{n} does not lie in the interior of the interval [a_{n}, b_{n}]. This proof comes from his 1879 proof, which contains a more complex inductive proof that demonstrates several properties of the intervals generated, including the property proved here.)

Case 3: a_{∞} < b_{∞}

Case 3: a_{∞} < b_{∞}. Then every y in [a_{∞}, b_{∞}] is not contained in the given sequence since for all n : y belongs to (a_{n}, b_{n}) but x_{n} does not.

The proof is complete since, in all cases, at least one real number in [a, b] has been found that is not contained in the given sequence. (Note: The main difference between Cantor's proof and the above proof is that he generates the sequence of closed intervals [a_{n}, b_{n}]. To find a_{n + 1} and b_{n + 1}, he uses the interior of the interval [a_{n}, b_{n}], which is the open interval (a_{n}, b_{n}). Generating open intervals combines Cantor's use of closed intervals and their interiors, which allows the case diagrams to depict all the details of the proof.)

Cantor's proofs are constructive and have been used to write a computer program that generates the digits of a transcendental number. This program applies Cantor's construction to a sequence containing all the real algebraic numbers between 0 and 1. The article that discusses this program gives some of its output, which shows how the construction generates a transcendental.

=== Example of Cantor's construction ===
An example illustrates how Cantor's construction works. Consider the sequence: 1/2, 1/3, 2/3, 1/4, 3/4, 1/5, 2/5, 3/5, 4/5, ... This sequence is obtained by ordering the rational numbers in (0, 1) by increasing denominators, ordering those with the same denominator by increasing numerators, and omitting reducible fractions. The table below shows the first five steps of the construction. The table's first column contains the intervals (a_{n}, b_{n}). The second column lists the terms visited during the search for the first two terms in (a_{n}, b_{n}). These two terms are in red.

Generating a number using Cantor's construction
Interval	Finding the next interval	Interval (decimal)
$\left(\;\frac{1}{3}, \;\;\!\frac{1}{2}\;\right)$	$\;\frac{2}{3}, \;\! \frac{1}{4}, \;\! \frac{3}{4}, \;\! \frac{1}{5}, \;\! {\color{red}\frac{2}{5},}\;\! \;\! \frac{3}{5}, \;\! \frac{4}{5}, \;\! \frac{1}{6}, \;\! \frac{5}{6}, \;\! \frac{1}{7}, \;\! \frac{2}{7}, \;\! {\color{red}\frac{3}{7}}$	$\left(0.3333\dots,\; 0.5000\dots\right)$
$\left(\;\frac{2}{5}, \;\;\!\frac{3}{7}\;\right)$	$\;\frac{4}{7}, \;\dots,\; \frac{1}{12}, {\color{red}\frac{5}{12},}\;\! \frac{7}{12}, \;\dots,\; \frac{6}{17}, {\color{red}\frac{7}{17}}$	$\left(0.4000\dots,\; 0.4285\dots\right)$
$\left(\frac{7}{17}, \frac{5}{12}\right)$	$\frac{8}{17}, \;\!\dots,\;\! \frac{11}{29}, {\color{red}\frac{12}{29},}\;\! \frac{13}{29}, \;\dots,\; \frac{16}{41}, {\color{red}\frac{17}{41}}$	$\left(0.4117\dots,\; 0.4166\dots\right)$
$\left(\frac{12}{29}, \frac{17}{41}\right)$	$\frac{18}{41}, \;\!\dots,\;\! \frac{27}{70}, {\color{red}\frac{29}{70},}\;\! \frac{31}{70}, \;\dots,\; \frac{40}{99}, {\color{red}\frac{41}{99}}$	$\left(0.4137\dots,\; 0.4146\dots\right)$
$\left(\frac{41}{99}, \frac{29}{70}\right)$	$\frac{43}{99}, \dots, \frac{69}{169}, {\color{red}\frac{70}{169},}\;\! \frac{71}{169}, \,\dots, \frac{98}{239}, {\color{red}\frac{99}{239}}$	$\left(0.4141\dots,\; 0.4142\dots\right)$

Since the sequence contains all the rational numbers in (0, 1), the construction generates an irrational number, which turns out to be √2 − 1.

Proof that the number generated is √2 − 1
The proof uses Farey sequences and simple continued fractions. The Farey sequence $F_n$ is the increasing sequence of completely reduced fractions whose denominators are $\leq n.$ If $\frac{a}{b}$ and $\frac{c}{d}$ are adjacent in a Farey sequence, the lowest denominator fraction between them is their mediant $\frac{a+c}{b+d}.$ This mediant is adjacent to both $\frac{a}{b}$ and $\frac{c}{d}$ in the Farey sequence $F_{b+d}.$

Cantor's construction produces mediants because the rational numbers were sequenced by increasing denominator. The first interval in the table is $(\frac{1}{3}, \frac{1}{2}).$ Since $\frac{1}{3}$ and $\frac{1}{2}$ are adjacent in $F_3,$ their mediant $\frac{2}{5}$ is the first fraction in the sequence between $\frac{1}{3}$ and $\frac{1}{2}.$ Hence, $\frac{1}{3} < \frac{2}{5} < \frac{1}{2}.$ In this inequality, $\frac{1}{2}$ has the smallest denominator, so the second fraction is the mediant of $\frac{2}{5}$ and $\frac{1}{2},$ which equals $\frac{3}{7}.$ This implies: $\frac{1}{3} < \frac{2}{5} < \frac{3}{7} < \frac{1}{2}.$ Therefore, the next interval is $(\frac{2}{5}, \frac{3}{7}).$

We will prove that the endpoints of the intervals converge to the continued fraction $[0; 2, 2, \dots].$ This continued fraction is the limit of its convergents:

$$\frac{p_n}{q_n} = [0; 2, \dots, 2]\;\;(n\;2\text{'s}).$$

The $p_n$ and $q_n$ sequences satisfy the equations:

$$p_0 = 0\;\;\;\;\;\;\;p_1 = 1\;\;\;\;\;\;\;p_{n+1} = 2p_n + p_{n-1} \text{ for } n \geq 1$$
$$q_0 = 1\;\;\;\;\;\;\;q_1 = 2\;\;\;\;\;\;\;q_{n+1} = 2q_n + q_{n-1} \text{ for } n \geq 1$$

First, we prove by induction that for odd n, the n-th interval in the table is:

$$\left(\frac{p_n + p_{n-1}}{q_n + q_{n-1}}, \frac{p_n}{q_n}\right)\!,$$

and for even n, the interval's endpoints are reversed: $\left(\frac{p_n}{q_n}, \frac{p_n + p_{n-1}}{q_n + q_{n-1}}\right)\!.$

This is true for the first interval since:

$$\left(\frac{p_1 + p_0}{q_1 + q_0}, \frac{p_1}{q_1}\right) = \left(\frac{1}{3}, \frac{1}{2}\right)\!.$$

Assume that the inductive hypothesis is true for the k-th interval. If k is odd, this interval is:

$$\left(\frac{p_k + p_{k-1}}{q_k + q_{k-1}}, \frac{p_k}{q_k}\right)\!.$$

The mediant of its endpoints $\frac{2p_k + p_{k-1}}{2q_k + q_{k-1}} = \frac{p_{k+1}}{q_{k+1}}$ is the first fraction in the sequence between these endpoints.

Hence, $\frac{p_k + p_{k-1}}{q_k + q_{k-1}} < \frac{p_{k+1}}{q_{k+1}} < \frac{p_k}{q_k}.$

In this inequality, $\frac{p_k}{q_k}$ has the smallest denominator, so the second fraction is the mediant of $\frac{p_{k+1}}{q_{k+1}}$ and $\frac{p_k}{q_k},$ which equals $\frac{p_{k+1} + p_k}{p_{k+1} + q_k}.$

This implies: $\frac{p_k + p_{k-1}}{q_k + q_{k-1}} < \frac{p_{k+1}}{q_{k+1}} < \frac{p_{k+1} + p_k}{p_{k+1} + q_k} < \frac{p_k}{q_k}.$

Therefore, the (k + 1)-st interval is $\left(\frac{p_{k+1}}{q_{k+1}}, \frac{p_{k+1} + p_k}{p_{k+1} + q_k}\right)\!.$

This is the desired interval; $\frac{p_{k+1}}{q_{k+1}}$ is the left endpoint because k + 1 is even. Thus, the inductive hypothesis is true for the (k + 1)-st interval. For even k, the proof is similar. This completes the inductive proof.

Since the right endpoints of the intervals are decreasing and every other endpoint is $\frac{p_{2n-1}}{q_{2n-1}},$ their limit equals $\lim_{n \to \infty} \frac{p_n}{q_n}.$ The left endpoints have the same limit because they are increasing and every other endpoint is $\frac{p_{2n}}{q_{2n}}.$ As mentioned above, this limit is the continued fraction $[0; 2, 2, \dots],$ which equals $\sqrt{2}-1.$

== Cantor's 1879 uncountability proof ==
=== Everywhere dense ===
In 1879, Cantor published a new uncountability proof that modifies his 1874 proof. He first defines the topological notion of a point set P being "everywhere dense in an interval": (Note: Cantor was not the first to define "everywhere dense" but his terminology was adopted with or without the "everywhere" (everywhere dense: Arkhangel'skii & Fedorchuk 1990, p. 15; dense: Kelley 1991, p. 49). In 1870, Hermann Hankel had defined this concept using different terminology: "a multitude of points ... fill the segment if no interval, however small, can be given within the segment in which one does not find at least one point of that multitude" (Ferreirós 2007, p. 155). Hankel was building on Peter Gustav Lejeune Dirichlet's 1829 article that contains the Dirichlet function, a non-(Riemann) integrable function whose value is 0 for rational numbers and 1 for irrational numbers. (Ferreirós 2007, p. 149.))

If P lies partially or completely in the interval [α, β], then the remarkable case can happen that every interval [γ, δ] contained in [α, β], no matter how small, contains points of P. In such a case, we will say that P is everywhere dense in the interval [α, β]. (Note: Translated from Cantor 1879, p. 2: Liegt P theilweise oder ganz im Intervalle (α . . . β), so kann der bemerkenswerthe Fall eintreten, dass jedes noch so kleine in (α . . . β) enthaltene Intervall (γ . . . δ) Punkte von P enthält. In einem solchen Falle wollen wir sagen, dass P im Intervalle (α . . . β) überall-dicht sei.)

In this discussion of Cantor's proof: a, b, c, d are used instead of α, β, γ, δ. Also, Cantor only uses his interval notation if the first endpoint is less than the second. For this discussion, this means that (a, b) implies a < b.

Since the discussion of Cantor's 1874 proof was simplified by using open intervals rather than closed intervals, the same simplification is used here. This requires an equivalent definition of everywhere dense: A set P is everywhere dense in the interval [a, b] if and only if every open subinterval (c, d) of [a, b] contains at least one point of P.

Cantor did not specify how many points of P an open subinterval (c, d) must contain. He did not need to specify this because the assumption that every open subinterval contains at least one point of P implies that every open subinterval contains infinitely many points of P. (Note: This is proved by generating a sequence of points belonging to both P and (c, d). Since P is dense in [a, b], the subinterval (c, d) contains at least one point x_{1} of P. By assumption, the subinterval (x_{1}, d) contains at least one point x_{2} of P and x_{2} > x_{1} since x_{2} belongs to this subinterval. In general, after generating x_{n}, the subinterval (x_{n}, d) is used to generate a point x_{n + 1} satisfying x_{n + 1} > x_{n}. The infinitely many points x_{n} belong to both P and (c, d).)

=== Cantor's 1879 proof ===
Cantor modified his 1874 proof with a new proof of its second theorem: Given any sequence P of real numbers x_{1}, x_{2}, x_{3}, ... and any interval [a, b], there is a number in [a, b] that is not contained in P. Cantor's new proof has only two cases. First, it handles the case of P not being dense in the interval, then it deals with the more difficult case of P being dense in the interval. This division into cases not only indicates which sequences are more difficult to handle, but it also reveals the important role denseness plays in the proof. (Note: Since Cantor's proof has not been published in English, an English translation is given alongside the original German text, which is from Cantor 1879, pp. 5–7. The translation starts one sentence before the proof because this sentence mentions Cantor's 1874 proof. Cantor states it was printed in Borchardt's Journal. Crelle's Journal was also called Borchardt's Journal from 1856-1880 when Carl Wilhelm Borchardt edited the journal (Audin 2011, p. 80). Square brackets are used to identify this mention of Cantor's earlier proof, to clarify the translation, and to provide page numbers. Also, "Mannichfaltigkeit" (manifold) has been translated to "set" and Cantor's notation for closed sets (α . . . β) has been translated to [α, β]. Cantor changed his terminology from Mannichfaltigkeit to Menge (set) in his 1883 article, which introduced sets of ordinal numbers (Kanamori 2012, p. 5). Currently in mathematics, a manifold is type of topological space.: English translation / German text; [Page 5]. . . But this contradicts a very general theorem, which we have proved with full rigor in Borchardt's Journal, Vol. 77, page 260; namely, the following theorem: "If one has a simply [countably] infinite sequence ω_{1}, ω_{2}, . . . , ω_{ν}, . . . of real, unequal numbers that proceed according to some rule, then in every given interval [α, β] a number η (and thus infinitely many of them) can be specified that does not occur in this sequence (as a member of it)." In view of the great interest in this theorem, not only in the present discussion, but also in many other arithmetical as well as analytical relations, it might not be superfluous if we develop the argument followed there [Cantor's 1874 proof] more clearly here by using simplifying modifications. Starting with the sequence: ω_{1}, ω_{2}, . . . , ω_{ν}, . . . (which we give [denote by] the symbol (ω)) and an arbitrary interval [α, β], where α < β, we will now demonstrate that in this interval a real number η can be found that does not occur in (ω). I. We first notice that if our set (ω) is not everywhere dense in the interval [α, β], then within this interval another interval [γ, δ] must be present, all of whose numbers do not belong to (ω). From the interval [γ, δ], one can then choose any number for η. It lies in the interval [α, β] and definitely does not occur in our sequence (ω). Thus, this case presents no special considerations and we can move on to the more difficult case. II. Let the set (ω) be everywhere dense in the interval [α, β]. In this case, every interval [γ,δ] located in [α,β], however small, contains numbers of our sequence (ω). To show that, nevertheless, numbers η in the interval [α, β] exist that do not occur in (ω), we employ the following observation. Since some numbers in our sequence: ω_{1}, ω_{2}, . . . , ω_{ν}, . . . / [Seite 5]. . . Dem widerspricht aber ein sehr allgemeiner Satz, welchen wir in Borchardt's Journal, Bd. 77, pag. 260, mit aller Strenge bewiesen haben, nämlich der folgende Satz: "Hat man eine einfach unendliche Reihe ω_{1}, ω_{2}, . . . , ω_{ν}, . . . von reellen, ungleichen Zahlen, die nach irgend einem Gesetz fortschreiten, so lässt sich in jedem vorgegebenen, Intervalle (α . . . β) eine Zahl η (und folglich lassen sich deren unendlich viele) angeben, welche nicht in jener Reihe (als Glied derselben) vorkommt." In Anbetracht des grossen Interesses, welches sich an diesen Satz, nicht blos bei der gegenwärtigen Erörterung, sondern auch in vielen anderen sowohl arithmetischen, wie analytischen Beziehungen, knüpft, dürfte es nicht überflüssig sein, wenn wir die dort befolgte Beweisführung [Cantors 1874 Beweis], unter Anwendung vereinfachender Modificationen, hier deutlicher entwickeln. Unter Zugrundelegung der Reihe: ω_{1}, ω_{2}, . . . , ω_{ν}, . . . (welcher wir das Zeichen (ω) beilegen) und eines beliebigen Intervalles (α . . . β), wo α < β ist, soll also nun gezeigt werden, dass in diesem Intervalle eine reelle Zahl η gefunden werden kann, welche in (ω) nicht vorkommt. I. Wir bemerken zunächst, dass wenn unsre Mannichfaltigkeit (ω) in dem Intervall (α . . . β) nicht überall-dicht ist, innerhalb dieses Intervalles ein anderes (γ . . . δ) vorhanden sein muss, dessen Zahlen sämmtlich nicht zu (ω) gehören; man kann alsdann für η irgend eine Zahl des Intervalls (γ . . . δ) wählen, sie liegt im Intervalle (α . . . β) und kommt sicher in unsrer Reihe (ω) nicht vor. Dieser Fall bietet daher keinerlei besondere Umstände; und wir können zu dem schwierigeren übergehen. II. Die Mannichfaltigkeit (ω) sei im Intervalle (α . . . β) überall-dicht. In diesem Falle enthält jedes, noch so kleine in (α . . . β) gelegene Intervall (γ . . . δ) Zahlen unserer Reihe (ω). Um zu zeigen, dass nichtsdestoweniger Zahlen η im Intervalle (α . . . β) existiren, welche in (ω) nicht vorkommen, stellen wir die folgende Betrachtung an. Da in unserer Reihe: ω_{1}, ω_{2}, . . . , ω_{ν}, . . .; [Page 6] definitely occur within the interval [α, β], one of these numbers must have the least index, let it be ω_{κ_{1}}, and another: ω_{κ_{2}} with the next larger index. Let the smaller of the two numbers ω_{κ_{1}}, ω_{κ_{2}} be denoted by α', the larger by β'. (Their equality is impossible because we assumed that our sequence consists of nothing but unequal numbers.) Then according to the definition: α < α' < β' < β , furthermore: κ_{1} < κ_{2} ; and all numbers ω_{μ} of our sequence, for which μ ≤ κ_{2}, do not lie in the interior of the interval [α', β'], as is immediately clear from the definition of the numbers κ_{1}, κ_{2}. Similarly, let ω_{κ_{3}} and ω_{κ_{4}} be the two numbers of our sequence with smallest indices that fall in the interior of the interval [α', β'] and let the smaller of the numbers ω_{κ_{3}}, ω_{κ_{4}} be denoted by α'', the larger by β''. Then one has: α' < α'' < β'' < β' , κ_{2} < κ_{3} < κ_{4} ; and one sees that all numbers ω_{μ} of our sequence, for which μ ≤ κ_{4}, do not fall into the interior of the interval [α'', β'']. After one has followed this rule to reach an interval [α^{(ν - 1)}, β^{(ν - 1)}], the next interval is produced by selecting the first two (i. e. with lowest indices) numbers of our sequence (ω) (let them be ω_{κ_{2ν - 1}} and ω_{κ_{2ν}}) that fall into the interior of [α^{(ν - 1)}, β^{(ν - 1)}]. Let the smaller of these two numbers be denoted by α^{(ν)}, the larger by β^{(ν)}. The interval [α^{(ν)}, β^{(ν)}] then lies in the interior of all preceding intervals and has the specific relation with our sequence (ω) that all numbers ω_{μ}, for which μ ≤ κ_{2ν}, definitely do not lie in its interior. Since obviously: κ_{1} < κ_{2} < κ_{3} < . . . , ω_{κ_{2ν – 2}} < ω_{κ_{2ν – 1}} < ω_{κ_{2ν}} , . . . and these numbers, as indices, are whole numbers, so: κ_{2ν} ≥ 2ν , and hence: ν < κ_{2ν} ; thus, we can certainly say (and this is sufficient for the following): That if ν is an arbitrary whole number, the [real] quantity ω_{ν} lies outside the interval [α^{(ν)} . . . β^{(ν)}]. / [Seite 6] sicher Zahlen innerhalb des Intervalls (α . . . β) vorkommen, so muss eine von diesen Zahlen den kleinsten Index haben, sie sei ω_{κ_{1}}, und eine andere: ω_{κ_{2}} mit dem nächst grösseren Index behaftet sein. Die kleinere der beiden Zahlen ω_{κ_{1}}, ω_{κ_{2}} werde mit α', die grössere mit β' bezeichnet. (Ihre Gleichheit ist ausgeschlossen, weil wir voraussetzten, dass unsere Reihe aus lauter ungleichen Zahlen besteht.) Es ist alsdann der Definition nach: α < α' < β' < β , ferner: κ_{1} < κ_{2} ; und ausserdem ist zu bemerken, dass alle Zahlen ω_{μ} unserer Reihe, für welche μ ≤ κ_{2}, nicht im Innern des Intervalls (α' . . . β') liegen, wie aus der Bestimmung der Zahlen κ_{1}, κ_{2} sofort erhellt. Ganz ebenso mögen ω_{κ_{3}}, ω_{κ_{4}} die beiden mit den kleinsten Indices versehenen Zahlen unserer Reihen [see note 1 below] sein, welche in das Innere des Intervalls (α' . . . β') fallen und die kleinere der Zahlen ω_{κ_{3}}, ω_{κ_{4}} werde mit α'', die grössere mit β'' bezeichnet. Man hat alsdann: α' < α'' < β'' < β' , κ_{2} < κ_{3} < κ_{4} ; und man erkennt, dass alle Zahlen ω_{μ} unserer Reihe, für welche μ ≤ κ_{4} nicht in das Innere des Intervalls (α'' . . . β'') fallen. Nachdem man unter Befolgung des gleichen Gesetzes zu einem Intervall (α^{(ν - 1)}, . . . β^{(ν - 1)}) gelangt ist, ergiebt sich das folgende Intervall dadurch aus demselben, dass man die beiden ersten (d. h. mit niedrigsten Indices versehenen) Zahlen unserer Reihe (ω) aufstellt (sie seien ω_{κ_{2ν – 1}} und ω_{κ_{2ν}}), welche in das Innere von (α^{(ν – 1)} . . . β^{(ν – 1)}) fallen; die kleinere dieser beiden Zahlen werde mit α^{(ν)}, die grössere mit β^{(ν)} bezeichnet. Das Intervall (α^{(ν)} . . . β^{(ν)}) liegt alsdann im Innern aller vorangegangenen Intervalle und hat zu unserer Reihe (ω) die eigenthümliche Beziehung, dass alle Zahlen ω_{μ}, für welche μ ≤ κ_{2ν} sicher nicht in seinem Innern liegen. Da offenbar: κ_{1} < κ_{2} < κ_{3} < . . . , ω_{κ_{2ν – 2}} < ω_{κ_{2ν – 1}} < ω_{κ_{2ν}} , . . . und diese Zahlen, als Indices, ganze Zahlen sind, so ist: κ_{2ν} ≥ 2ν , und daher: ν < κ_{2ν} ; wir können daher, und dies ist für das Folgende ausreichend, gewiss sagen: Dass, wenn ν eine beliebige ganze Zahl ist, die Grösse ω_{ν} ausserhalb des Intervalls (α^{(ν)} . . . β^{(ν)}) liegt.; [Page 7] Since the numbers α', α'', α''', . . ., α^{(ν)}, . . . are continually increasing by value while simultaneously being enclosed in the interval [α, β], they have, by a well-known fundamental theorem of the theory of magnitudes [see note 2 below], a limit that we denote by A, so that: A = Lim α^{(ν)} for ν = ∞. The same applies to the numbers β', β'', β''', . . ., β^{(ν)}, . . ., which are continually decreasing and likewise lying in the interval [α, β]. We call their limit B, so that: B = Lim β^{(ν)} for ν = ∞. Obviously, one has: α^{(ν)} < A ≤ B < β^{(ν)}. But it is easy to see that the case A < B can not occur here since otherwise every number ω_{ν} of our sequence would lie outside of the interval [A, B] by lying outside the interval [α^{(ν)}, β^{(ν)}]. So our sequence (ω) would not be everywhere dense in the interval [α, β], contrary to the assumption. Thus, there only remains the case A = B and now it is demonstrated that the number: η = A = B does not occur in our sequence (ω). If it were a member of our sequence, such as the ν^{th}, then one would have: η = ω_{ν}. But the latter equation is not possible for any value of ν because η is in the interior of the interval [α^{(ν)}, β^{(ν)}], but ω_{ν} lies outside of it. / [Seite 7] Da die Zahlen α', α'', α''', . . ., α^{(ν)}, . . . ihrer Grösse nach fortwährend wachsen, dabei jedoch im Intervalle (α . . . β) eingeschlossen sind, so haben sie, nach einem bekannten Fundamentalsatze der Grössenlehre, eine Grenze, die wir mit A bezeichnen, so dass: A = Lim α^{(ν)} für ν = ∞. Ein Gleiches gilt für die Zahlen β', β'', β''', . . ., β^{(ν)}, . . . welche fortwährend abnehmen und dabei ebenfalls im Intervalle (α . . . β) liegen; wir nennen ihre Grenze B, so dass: B = Lim β^{(ν)} für ν = ∞. Man hat offenbar: α^{(ν)} < A ≤ B < β^{(ν)}. Es ist aber leicht zu sehen, dass der Fall A < B hier nicht vorkommen kann; da sonst jede Zahl ω_{ν}, unserer Reihe ausserhalb des Intervalles (A . . . B) liegen würde, indem ω_{ν}, ausserhalb des Intervalls (α^{(ν)} . . . β^{(ν)}) gelegen ist; unsere Reihe (ω) wäre im Intervall (α . . . β) nicht überalldicht, gegen die Voraussetzung. Es bleibt daher nur der Fall A = B übrig und es zeigt sich nun, dass die Zahl: η = A = B in unserer Reihe (ω) nicht vorkommt. Denn, würde sie ein Glied unserer Reihe sein, etwa das ν^{te}, so hätte man: η = ω_{ν}. Die letztere Gleichung ist aber für keinen Werth von v möglich, weil η im Innern des Intervalls [α^{(ν)}, β^{(ν)}], ω_{ν} aber ausserhalb desselben liegt.; Note 1: This is the only occurrence of "unserer Reihen" ("our sequences") in the proof. There is only one sequence involved in Cantor's proof and everywhere else "Reihe" ("sequence") is used, so it is most likely a typographical error and should be "unserer Reihe" ("our sequence"), which is how it has been translated. Note 2: Grössenlehre, which has been translated as "the theory of magnitudes", is a term used by 19th century German mathematicians that refers to the theory of discrete and continuous magnitudes. (Ferreirós 2007, pp. 41–42, 202.))

In the first case, P is not dense in [a, b]. By definition, P is dense in [a, b] if and only if for all subintervals (c, d) of [a, b], there is an x ∈ P such that x ∈ (c, d). Taking the negation of each side of the "if and only if" produces: P is not dense in [a, b] if and only if there exists a subinterval (c, d) of [a, b] such that for all x ∈ P : x ∉ (c, d). Therefore, every number in (c, d) is not contained in the sequence P. This case handles case 1 and case 3 of Cantor's 1874 proof.

In the second case, which handles case 2 of Cantor's 1874 proof, P is dense in [a, b]. The denseness of sequence P is used to recursively define a sequence of nested intervals that excludes all the numbers in P and whose intersection contains a single real number in [a, b]. The sequence of intervals starts with (a, b). Given an interval in the sequence, the next interval is obtained by finding the two numbers with the least indices that belong to P and to the current interval. These two numbers are the endpoints of the next open interval. Since an open interval excludes its endpoints, every nested interval eliminates two numbers from the front of sequence P, which implies that the intersection of the nested intervals excludes all the numbers in P. Details of this proof and a proof that this intersection contains a single real number in [a, b] are given below.

Definition and proofs for the nested intervals
The denseness of sequence P is used to recursively define a nested sequence of intervals that excludes all of the numbers in P. The base case starts with the interval (a, b). Since P is dense in [a, b], there are infinitely many numbers of P in (a, b). Let x_{k_{1}} be the number with the least index and x_{k_{2}} be the number with the next larger index, and let a_{1} be the smaller and b_{1} be the larger of these two numbers. Then, k_{1} < k_{2}, a < a_{1} < b_{1} < b, and (a_{1}, b_{1}) is a proper subinterval of (a, b). Also, x_{m} ∉ (a_{1}, b_{1}) for m ≤ k_{2} since these x_{m} are the endpoints of (a_{1}, b_{1}). Repeating the above proof with the interval (a_{1}, b_{1}) produces k_{3}, k_{4}, a_{2}, b_{2} such that k_{1} < k_{2} < k_{3} < k_{4} and a < a_{1} < a_{2} < b_{2} < b_{1} < b and x_{m} ∉ (a_{2}, b_{2}) for m ≤ k_{4}.

The recursive step starts with the interval (a_{n–1}, b_{n–1}), the inequalities k_{1} < k_{2} < . . . < k_{2n–2} < k_{2n–1} and a < a_{1} < . . . < a_{n–1} < b_{n–1} . . . < b_{1} < b, and the fact that the interval (a_{n–1}, b_{n–1}) excludes the first 2n –2 members of the sequence P — that is, x_{m} ∉ (a_{n–1}, b_{n–1}) for m ≤ k_{2n–2}. Since P is dense in [a, b], there are infinitely many numbers of P in (a_{n–1}, b_{n–1}). Let x_{k_{2n –1}} be the number with the least index and x_{k_{2n}} be the number with the next larger index, and let a_{n} be the smaller and b_{n} be the larger of these two numbers. Then, k_{2n –1} < k_{2n}, a_{n–1} < a_{n} < b_{n} < b_{n–1}, and (a_{n}, b_{n}) is a proper subinterval of (a_{n–1}, b_{n–1}). Combining these inequalities with the ones for step n –1 of the recursion produces k_{1} < k_{2} < . . . < k_{2n–1} < k_{2n} and a < a_{1} < . . . < a_{n} < b_{n} . . . < b_{1} < b. Also, x_{m} ∉ (a_{n}, b_{n}) for m = k_{2n–1} and m = k_{2n} since these x_{m} are the endpoints of (a_{n}, b_{n}). This together with (a_{n–1}, b_{n–1}) excluding the first 2n –2 members of sequence P implies that the interval (a_{n}, b_{n}) excludes the first 2n members of P — that is, x_{m} ∉ (a_{n}, b_{n}) for m ≤ k_{2n}. Therefore, for all n, x_{n} ∉ (a_{n}, b_{n}) since n ≤ k_{2n}.

The sequence a_{n} is increasing and bounded above by b, so the limit A = lim_{n → ∞} a_{n} exists. Similarly, the limit B = lim_{n → ∞} b_{n} exists since the sequence b_{n} is decreasing and bounded below by a. Also, a_{n} < b_{n} implies A ≤ B. If A < B, then for every n: x_{n} ∉ (A, B) because x_{n} is not in the larger interval (a_{n}, b_{n}). This contradicts P being dense in [a, b]. Hence, A = B. For all n, A ∈ (a_{n}, b_{n}) but x_{n} ∉ (a_{n}, b_{n}). Therefore, A is a number in [a, b] that is not contained in P.

== The development of Cantor's ideas ==
The development leading to Cantor's 1874 article appears in the correspondence between Cantor and Richard Dedekind. On November 29, 1873, Cantor asked Dedekind whether the collection of positive integers and the collection of positive real numbers "can be corresponded so that each individual of one collection corresponds to one and only one individual of the other?" Cantor added that collections having such a correspondence include the collection of positive rational numbers, and collections of the form (a_{n_{1}, n_{2}, . . . , n_{ν}}) where n_{1}, n_{2}, . . . , n_{ν}, and ν are positive integers.

Dedekind replied that he was unable to answer Cantor's question, and said that it "did not deserve too much effort because it has no particular practical interest". Dedekind also sent Cantor a proof that the set of algebraic numbers is countable.

On December 2, Cantor responded that his question does have interest: "It would be nice if it could be answered; for example, provided that it could be answered no, one would have a new proof of Liouville's theorem that there are transcendental numbers."

On December 7, Cantor sent Dedekind a proof by contradiction that the set of real numbers is uncountable. Cantor starts by assuming that the real numbers in $[0,1]$ can be written as a sequence. Then, he applies a construction to this sequence to produce a number in $[0,1]$ that is not in the sequence, thus contradicting his assumption. Together, the letters of December 2 and 7 provide a non-constructive proof of the existence of transcendental numbers. Also, the proof in Cantor's December 7 letter shows some of the reasoning that led to his discovery that the real numbers form an uncountable set.

Cantor's December 7, 1873 proof

The proof is by contradiction and starts by assuming that the real numbers in $[0,1]$ can be written as a sequence:

$$(\mathrm{I})\;\; \omega_1, \,\omega_2, \,\omega_3, \,\ldots, \,\omega_n, \,\ldots$$

An increasing sequence is extracted from this sequence by letting $\omega_1^1 =$ the first term$, \ \omega_1^2 =$ the next largest term following $\omega_1^1, \ \omega_1^3 =$ the next largest term following $\omega_1^2,$ and so forth. The same procedure is applied to the remaining members of the original sequence to extract another increasing sequence. By continuing this process of extracting sequences, one sees that the sequence $(\mathrm{I})$ can be decomposed into the infinitely many sequences:

$$(1)\;\; \omega_1^1, \,\omega_1^2, \,\omega_1^3, \,\ldots, \,\omega_1^n, \,\ldots$$
$$(2)\;\; \omega_2^1, \,\omega_2^2, \,\omega_2^3, \,\ldots, \,\omega_2^n, \,\ldots$$
$$(3)\;\; \omega_3^1, \,\omega_3^2, \,\omega_3^3, \,\ldots, \,\omega_3^n, \,\ldots$$
$$\ \ \vdots$$

Let $[p,q]$ be an interval such that no term of sequence (1) lies in it. For example, let $p$ and $q$ satisfy $\omega_1^1 < p < q < \omega_1^2.$ Then $\omega_1^1 < p < q < \omega_1^n$ for $n \ge 2,$ so no term of sequence (1) lies in $[p,q].$

Now consider whether the terms of the other sequences lie outside $[p, q].$ All terms of some of these sequences may lie outside of $[p, q];$ however, there must be some sequence such that not all its terms lie outside $[p, q].$ Otherwise, the numbers in $[p, q]$ would not be contained in sequence $(\mathrm{I}),$ contrary to the initial hypothesis. Let sequence $(k)$ be the first sequence that contains a term in $[p, q]$ and let $\omega_k^n$ be the first term. Since $p < \omega_k^n < q,$ let $p_1$ and $q_1$ satisfy $p < p_1 < q_1 < \omega_k^n < q.$ Then $[p, q]$ is a proper superset of $[p_1, q_1]$ (in symbols, $[p, q] \supsetneq [p_1, q_1]$). Also, the terms of sequences $(1), (2),\ldots, (k - 1)$ lie outside of $[p_1, q_1].$

Repeat the above argument starting with $[p_1, q_1]\!:\,$ Let sequence $(k_1)$ be the first sequence containing a term in $[p_1, q_1]$ and let $\omega_{k_1}^n$ be the first term. Since $\ p_1 < \omega_{k_1}^n < q_1,$ let $p_2$ and $q_2$ satisfy $p_1 < p_2 < q_2 < \omega_{k_1}^n < q_1.$ Then $[p_1, q_1] \supsetneq [p_2, q_2]$ and the terms of sequences $(k_1), \ldots, (k_2 - 1)$ lie outside of $[p_2, q_2].$

One sees that it is possible to form an infinite sequence of nested intervals $[p, q] \supsetneq [p_1, q_1] \supsetneq [p_2, q_2] \supsetneq \ldots$ such that:
the members of the $1^\text{st}, 2^\text{nd}, \ldots, (k - 1)^\text{st}$ sequence lie outside $[p, q];$
the members of the $k^\text{th}, \ldots, (k_1 - 1)^\text{st}$ sequence lie outside $[p_1, q_1];$
the members of the $(k_1)^\text{th}, \ldots, (k_2 - 1)^\text{st}$ sequence lie outside $[p_2, q_2];$
$\ldots;$

Since $p_n$ and $q_n$ are bounded monotonic sequences, the limits $\lim_{n \to \infty}p_n$ and $\lim_{n \to \infty}q_n$ exist. Also, $p_n < q_n$ for all $n$ implies $\lim_{n \to \infty}p_n \leq \lim_{n \to \infty}q_n.$ Hence, there is at least one number $\eta$ in $(0, 1)$ that lies in all the intervals $[p, q]$ and $[p_n, q_n].$ Namely, $\eta$ can be any number in $[\lim_{n \to \infty}p_n, \lim_{n \to \infty}q_n].$ This implies that $\eta$ lies outside all the sequences $(1), (2), (3), \ldots,$ contradicting the initial hypothesis that sequence $(\mathrm{I})$ contains all the real numbers in $[0,1].$ Therefore, the set of all real numbers is uncountable.

Dedekind received Cantor's proof on December 8. On that same day, Dedekind simplified the proof and mailed his proof to Cantor. Cantor used Dedekind's proof in his article. The letter containing Cantor's December 7 proof was not published until 1937.

On December 9, Cantor announced the theorem that allowed him to construct transcendental numbers as well as prove the uncountability of the set of real numbers:

I show directly that if I start with a sequence

(1) ω_{1}, ω_{2}, ... , ω_{n}, ...

I can determine, in every given interval [α, β], a number η that is not included in (1).

This is the second theorem in Cantor's article. It comes from realizing that his construction can be applied to any sequence, not just to sequences that supposedly enumerate the real numbers. So Cantor had a choice between two proofs that demonstrate the existence of transcendental numbers: one proof is constructive, but the other is not. These two proofs can be compared by starting with a sequence consisting of all the real algebraic numbers.

The constructive proof applies Cantor's construction to this sequence and the interval [a, b] to produce a transcendental number in this interval.

The non-constructive proof uses two proofs by contradiction:

1. The proof by contradiction used to prove the uncountability theorem (see Proof of Cantor's uncountability theorem).
2. The proof by contradiction used to prove the existence of transcendental numbers from the countability of the real algebraic numbers and the uncountability of real numbers. Cantor's December 2nd letter mentions this existence proof but does not contain it. Here is a proof: Assume that there are no transcendental numbers in [a, b]. Then all the numbers in [a, b] are algebraic. This implies that they form a subsequence of the sequence of all real algebraic numbers, which contradicts Cantor's uncountability theorem. Thus, the assumption that there are no transcendental numbers in [a, b] is false. Therefore, there is a transcendental number in [a, b]. (Note: The beginning of this proof is derived from the proof below by restricting its numbers to the interval [a, b] and by using a subsequence since Cantor was using sequences in his 1873 work on countability. German text: Satz 68. Es gibt transzendente Zahlen. Gäbe es nämlich keine transzendenten Zahlen, so wären alle Zahlen algebraisch, das Kontinuum also identisch mit der Menge aller algebraischen Zahlen. Das ist aber unmöglich, weil die Menge aller algebraischen Zahlen abzählbar ist, das Kontinuum aber nicht. Translation: Theorem 68. There are transcendental numbers. If there were no transcendental numbers, then all numbers would be algebraic. Hence, the continuum would be identical to the set of all algebraic numbers. However, this is impossible because the set of all algebraic numbers is countable, but the continuum is not.)

Cantor chose to publish the constructive proof, which not only produces a transcendental number but is also shorter and avoids two proofs by contradiction. The non-constructive proof from Cantor's correspondence is simpler than the one above because it works with all the real numbers rather than the interval [a, b]. This eliminates the subsequence step and all occurrences of [a, b] in the second proof by contradiction.

== A misconception about Cantor's work ==
Akihiro Kanamori, who specializes in set theory, stated that "Accounts of Cantor's work have mostly reversed the order for deducing the existence of transcendental numbers, establishing first the uncountability of the reals and only then drawing the existence conclusion from the countability of the algebraic numbers. In textbooks the inversion may be inevitable, but this has promoted the misconception that Cantor's arguments are non-constructive."

Cantor's published proof and the reverse-order proof both use the theorem: Given a sequence of reals, a real can be found that is not in the sequence. By applying this theorem to the sequence of real algebraic numbers, Cantor produced a transcendental number. He then proved that the reals are uncountable: Assume that there is a sequence containing all the reals. Applying the theorem to this sequence produces a real not in the sequence, contradicting the assumption that the sequence contains all the reals. Hence, the reals are uncountable. The reverse-order proof starts by first proving the reals are uncountable. It then proves that transcendental numbers exist: If there were no transcendental numbers, all the reals would be algebraic and hence countable, which contradicts what was just proved. This contradiction proves that transcendental numbers exist without constructing any.

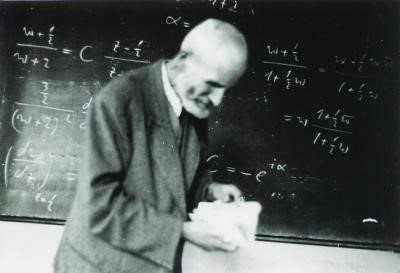
Oskar Perron, c. 1948

The correspondence containing Cantor's non-constructive reasoning was published in 1937. By then, other mathematicians had rediscovered his non-constructive, reverse-order proof. As early as 1921, this proof was called "Cantor's proof" and criticized for not producing any transcendental numbers. In that year, Oskar Perron gave the reverse-order proof and then stated: "... Cantor's proof for the existence of transcendental numbers has, along with its simplicity and elegance, the great disadvantage that it is only an existence proof; it does not enable us to actually specify even a single transcendental number." (Note: By "Cantor's proof," Perron does not mean that it is a proof published by Cantor. Rather, he means that the proof only uses arguments that Cantor published. For example, to obtain a real not in a given sequence, Perron follows Cantor's 1874 proof except for one modification: he uses Cantor's 1891 diagonal argument instead of his 1874 nested intervals argument to obtain a real. Cantor never used his diagonal argument to reprove his theorem. In this case, both Cantor's proof and Perron's proof are constructive, so no misconception can arise here. Then, Perron modifies Cantor's proof of the existence of a transcendental by giving the reverse-order proof. This converts Cantor's 1874 constructive proof into a non-constructive proof which leads to the misconception about Cantor's work.)

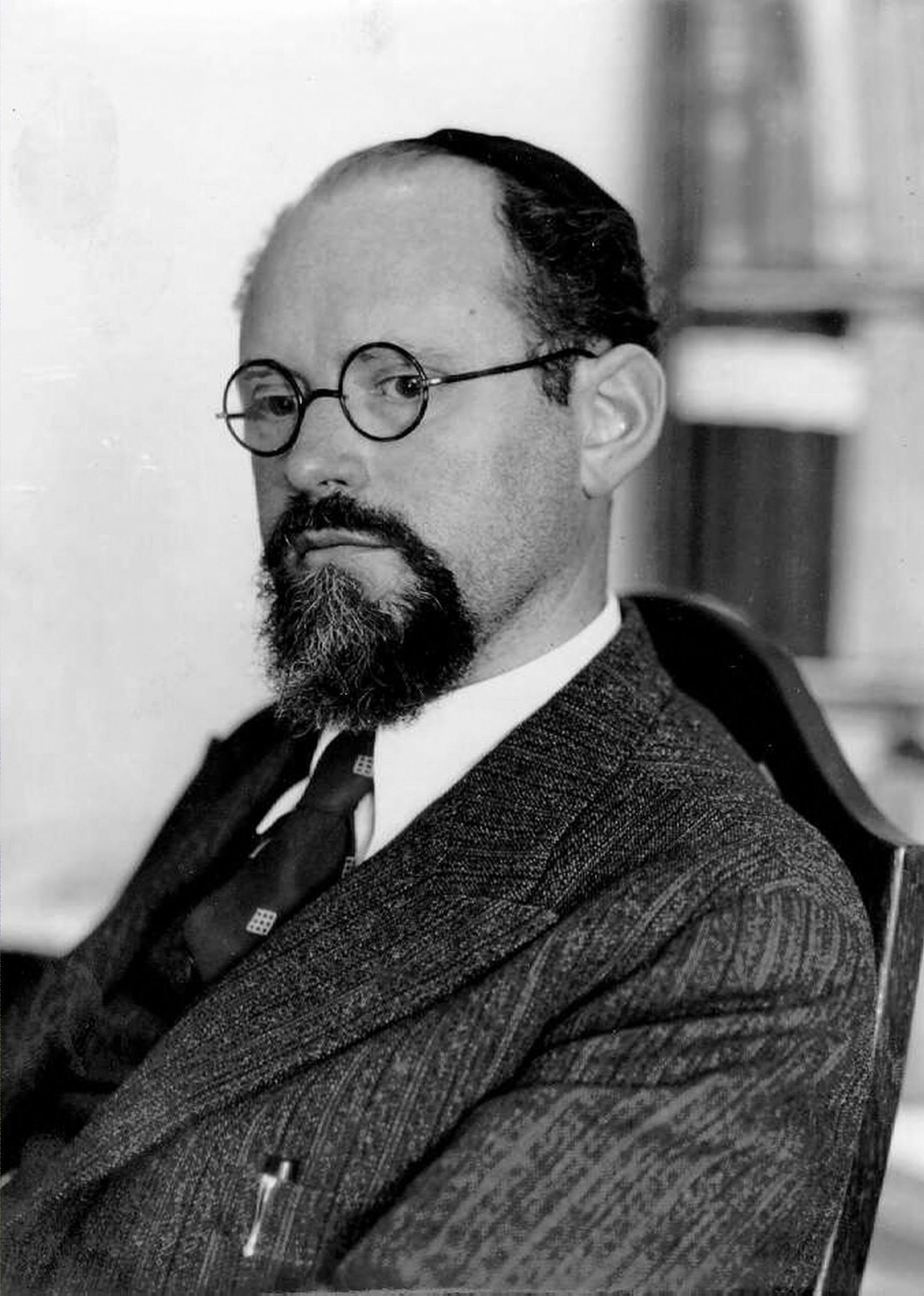
Abraham Fraenkel, between 1939 and 1949

As early as 1930, some mathematicians have attempted to correct this misconception of Cantor's work. In that year, the set theorist Abraham Fraenkel stated that Cantor's method is "... a method that incidentally, contrary to a widespread interpretation, is fundamentally constructive and not merely existential." In 1972, Irving Kaplansky wrote: "It is often said that Cantor's proof is not 'constructive,' and so does not yield a tangible transcendental number. This remark is not justified. If we set up a definite listing of all algebraic numbers ... and then apply the diagonal procedure ..., we get a perfectly definite transcendental number (it could be computed to any number of decimal places)." (Note: This proof is the same as Cantor's 1874 proof except for one modification: it uses his 1891 diagonal argument instead of his 1874 nested intervals argument to obtain a real.) Cantor's proof is not only constructive, it is also simpler than Perron's proof, which requires the detour of first proving that the set of all reals is uncountable.

Cantor's diagonal argument has often replaced his 1874 construction in expositions of his proof. The diagonal argument is constructive and produces a more efficient computer program than his 1874 construction. Using it, a computer program has been written that computes the digits of a transcendental number in polynomial time. The program that uses Cantor's 1874 construction requires at least sub-exponential time. (Note: The program using the diagonal method produces $n$ digits in ${\color{Blue}O}(n^2 \log^2 n \log \log n)$ steps, while the program using the 1874 method requires at least $O(2^{\sqrt[3]{n}})$ steps to produce $n$ digits. (Gray 1994, pp. 822–823.))

The presentation of the non-constructive proof without mentioning Cantor's constructive proof appears in some books that were quite successful as measured by the length of time new editions or reprints appeared—for example: Oskar Perron's Irrationalzahlen (1921; 1960, 4th edition), Eric Temple Bell's Men of Mathematics (1937; still being reprinted), Godfrey Hardy and E. M. Wright's An Introduction to the Theory of Numbers (1938; 2008 6th edition), Garrett Birkhoff and Saunders Mac Lane's A Survey of Modern Algebra (1941; 1997 5th edition), and Michael Spivak's Calculus (1967; 2008 4th edition). (Note: Starting with Hardy and Wright's book, these books are linked to Perron's book via their bibliographies: Perron's book is mentioned in the bibliography of Hardy and Wright's book, which in turn is mentioned in the bibliography of Birkhoff and Mac Lane's book and in the bibliography of Spivak's book. (Hardy & Wright 1938, p. 400; Birkhoff & Mac Lane 1941, p. 441; Spivak 1967, p. 515.)) Since 2014, at least two books have appeared stating that Cantor's proof is constructive, and at least four have appeared stating that his proof does not construct any (or a single) transcendental.

Asserting that Cantor gave a non-constructive argument without mentioning the constructive proof he published can lead to erroneous statements about the history of mathematics. In A Survey of Modern Algebra, Birkhoff and Mac Lane state: "Cantor's argument for this result [Not every real number is algebraic] was at first rejected by many mathematicians, since it did not exhibit any specific transcendental number." The proof that Cantor published produces transcendental numbers, and there appears to be no evidence that his argument was rejected. Even Leopold Kronecker, who had strict views on what is acceptable in mathematics and who could have delayed publication of Cantor's article, did not delay it. In fact, applying Cantor's construction to the sequence of real algebraic numbers produces a limiting process that Kronecker accepted—namely, it determines a number to any required degree of accuracy. (Note: Kronecker's opinion was: "Definitions must contain the means of reaching a decision in a finite number of steps, and existence proofs must be conducted so that the quantity in question can be calculated with any required degree of accuracy." So Kronecker would accept Cantor's argument as a valid existence proof, but he would not accept its conclusion that transcendental numbers exist. For Kronecker, they do not exist because their definition contains no means for deciding in a finite number of steps whether or not a given number is transcendental. Cantor's 1874 construction calculates numbers to any required degree of accuracy because: Given a k, an n can be computed such that b_{n} – a_{n} ≤ 1/k where (a_{n}, b_{n}) is the n-th interval of Cantor's construction. An example of how to prove this is given in Gray 1994, p. 822. Cantor's diagonal argument provides an accuracy of 10^{−n} after n real algebraic numbers have been calculated because each of these numbers generates one digit of the transcendental number.)

== The influence of Weierstrass and Kronecker on Cantor's article ==
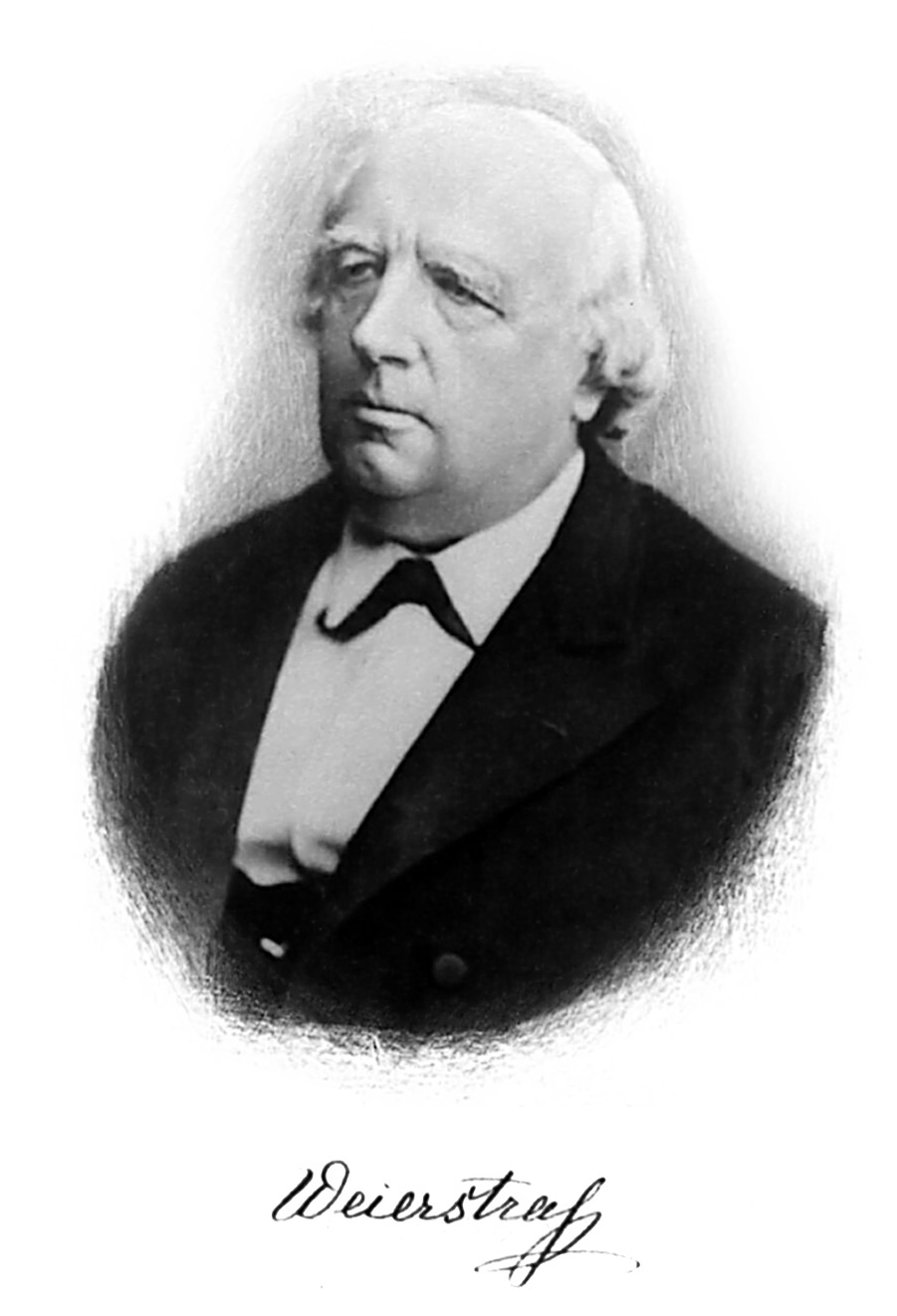
Karl Weierstrass

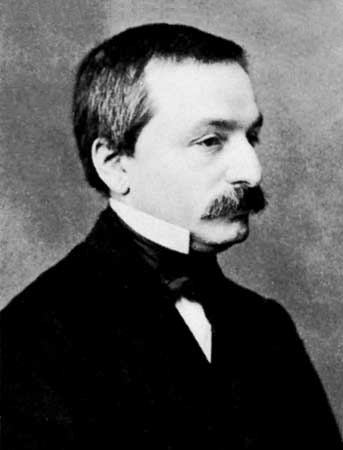
Leopold Kronecker, 1865

Historians of mathematics have discovered the following facts about Cantor's article "On a Property of the Collection of All Real Algebraic Numbers":

- Cantor's uncountability theorem was left out of the article he submitted. He added it during proofreading.
- The article's title refers to the set of real algebraic numbers. The main topic in Cantor's correspondence was the set of real numbers.
- The proof of Cantor's second theorem came from Dedekind. However, it omits Dedekind's explanation of why the limits a_{∞} and b_{∞} exist.
- Cantor restricted his first theorem to the set of real algebraic numbers. The proof he was using demonstrates the countability of the set of all algebraic numbers.

To explain these facts, historians have pointed to the influence of Cantor's former professors, Karl Weierstrass and Leopold Kronecker. Cantor discussed his results with Weierstrass on December 23, 1873. Weierstrass was first amazed by the concept of countability, but then found the countability of the set of real algebraic numbers useful. Cantor did not want to publish yet, but Weierstrass felt that he must publish at least his results concerning the algebraic numbers.

From his correspondence, it appears that Cantor only discussed his article with Weierstrass. However, Cantor told Dedekind: "The restriction which I have imposed on the published version of my investigations is caused in part by local circumstances ..." Cantor biographer Joseph Dauben believes that "local circumstances" refers to Kronecker who, as a member of the editorial board of Crelle's Journal, had delayed publication of an 1870 article by Eduard Heine, one of Cantor's colleagues. Cantor would submit his article to Crelle's Journal.

Weierstrass advised Cantor to leave his uncountability theorem out of the article he submitted, but Weierstrass also told Cantor that he could add it as a marginal note during proofreading, which he did. It appears in a remark at the end of the article's introduction. The opinions of Kronecker and Weierstrass both played a role here. Kronecker did not accept infinite sets, and it seems that Weierstrass did not accept that two infinite sets could be so different, with one being countable and the other not. Weierstrass changed his opinion later. Without the uncountability theorem, the article needed a title that did not refer to this theorem. Cantor chose "Ueber eine Eigenschaft des Inbegriffes aller reellen algebraischen Zahlen" ("On a Property of the Collection of All Real Algebraic Numbers"), which refers to the countability of the set of real algebraic numbers, the result that Weierstrass found useful.

Kronecker's influence appears in the proof of Cantor's second theorem. Cantor used Dedekind's version of the proof except he left out why the limits a_{∞} = lim_{n → ∞} a_{n} and b_{∞} = lim_{n → ∞} b_{n} exist. Dedekind had used his "principle of continuity" to prove they exist. This principle (which is equivalent to the least upper bound property of the real numbers) comes from Dedekind's construction of the real numbers, a construction Kronecker did not accept.

Cantor restricted his first theorem to the set of real algebraic numbers even though Dedekind had sent him a proof that handled all algebraic numbers. Cantor did this for expository reasons and because of "local circumstances". This restriction simplifies the article because the second theorem works with real sequences. Hence, the construction in the second theorem can be applied directly to the enumeration of the real algebraic numbers to produce "an effective procedure for the calculation of transcendental numbers". This procedure would be acceptable to Weierstrass.

== Dedekind's contributions to Cantor's article ==
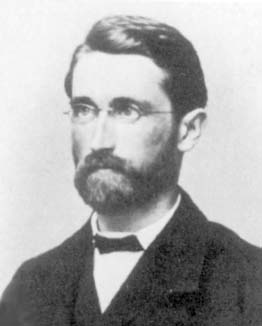
Richard Dedekind, c. 1870

Since 1856, Dedekind had developed theories involving infinitely many infinite sets—for example: ideals, which he used in algebraic number theory, and Dedekind cuts, which he used to construct the real numbers. This work enabled him to understand and contribute to Cantor's work.

Dedekind's first contribution concerns the theorem that the set of real algebraic numbers is countable. Cantor is usually given credit for this theorem, but the mathematical historian José Ferreirós calls it "Dedekind's theorem." Their correspondence reveals what each mathematician contributed to the theorem.

In his letter introducing the concept of countability, Cantor stated without proof that the set of positive rational numbers is countable, as are sets of the form (a_{n_{1}, n_{2}, ..., n_{ν}}) where n_{1}, n_{2}, ..., n_{ν}, and ν are positive integers. Cantor's second result uses an indexed family of numbers: a set of the form (a_{n_{1}, n_{2}, ..., n_{ν}}) is the range of a function from the ν indices to the set of real numbers. His second result implies his first: let ν = 2 and a_{n_{1}, n_{2}} = n_{1}/n_{2}. The function can be quite general—for example, a_{n_{1}, n_{2}, n_{3}, n_{4}, n_{5}} = (n_{1}/n_{2})^{1/n_{3}} + tan(n_{4}/n_{5}).

Dedekind replied with a proof of the theorem that the set of all algebraic numbers is countable. In his reply to Dedekind, Cantor did not claim to have proved Dedekind's result. He did indicate how he proved his theorem about indexed families of numbers: "Your proof that (n) [the set of positive integers] can be correlated one-to-one with the field of all algebraic numbers is approximately the same as the way I prove my contention in the last letter. I take n_{1}^{2} + n_{2}^{2} + ··· + n_{ν}^{2} = $\mathfrak{N}$ and order the elements accordingly." However, Cantor's ordering is weaker than Dedekind's and cannot be extended to $n$-tuples of integers that include zeros.

Dedekind's second contribution is his proof of Cantor's second theorem. Dedekind sent this proof in reply to Cantor's letter that contained the uncountability theorem, which Cantor proved using infinitely many sequences. Cantor next wrote that he had found a simpler proof that did not use infinitely many sequences. So Cantor had a choice of proofs and chose to publish Dedekind's.

Cantor thanked Dedekind privately for his help: "... your comments (which I value highly) and your manner of putting some of the points were of great assistance to me." However, he did not mention Dedekind's help in his article. In previous articles, he had acknowledged help received from Kronecker, Weierstrass, Heine, and Hermann Schwarz. Cantor's failure to mention Dedekind's contributions damaged his relationship with Dedekind. Dedekind stopped replying to his letters and did not resume the correspondence until October 1876. (Note: Ferreirós has analyzed the relations between Cantor and Dedekind. He explains why "Relations between both mathematicians were difficult after 1874, when they underwent an interruption..." (Ferreirós 1993, pp. 344, 348–352.))

== The legacy of Cantor's article ==
Cantor's article introduced the uncountability theorem and the concept of countability. Both would lead to significant developments in mathematics. The uncountability theorem demonstrated that one-to-one correspondences can be used to analyze infinite sets. In 1878, Cantor used them to define and compare cardinalities. He also constructed one-to-one correspondences to prove that the n-dimensional spaces R^{n} (where R is the set of real numbers) and the set of irrational numbers have the same cardinality as R. (Note: Cantor's method of constructing a one-to-one correspondence between the set of irrational numbers and R can be used to construct one between the set of transcendental numbers and R. The construction begins with the set of transcendental numbers T and removes a countable subset {t_{n}} (for example, t_{n} = e/n). Let this set be T_{0}. Then T = T_{0} ∪ {t_{n}} = T_{0} ∪ {t_{2n – 1}} ∪ {t_{2n}}, and R = T ∪ {a_{n}} = T_{0} ∪ {t_{n}} ∪ {a_{n}} where a_{n} is the sequence of real algebraic numbers. So both T and R are the union of three pairwise disjoint sets: T_{0} and two countable sets. A one-to-one correspondence between T and R is given by the function: g(t) = t if t ∈ T_{0}, g(t_{2n – 1}) = t_{n}, and g(t_{2n}) = a_{n}.)

In 1883, Cantor extended the positive integers with his infinite ordinals. This extension was necessary for his work on the Cantor–Bendixson theorem. Cantor discovered other uses for the ordinals—for example, he used sets of ordinals to produce an infinity of sets having different infinite cardinalities. His work on infinite sets together with Dedekind's set-theoretical work created set theory.

The concept of countability led to countable operations and objects that are used in various areas of mathematics. For example, in 1878, Cantor introduced countable unions of sets. In the 1890s, Émile Borel used countable unions in his theory of measure, and René Baire used countable ordinals to define his classes of functions. Building on the work of Borel and Baire, Henri Lebesgue created his theories of measure and integration, which were published from 1899 to 1901.

Countable models are used in set theory. In 1922, Thoralf Skolem proved that if conventional axioms of set theory are consistent, then they have a countable model. Since this model is countable, its set of real numbers is countable. This consequence is called Skolem's paradox, and Skolem explained why it does not contradict Cantor's uncountability theorem: although there is a one-to-one correspondence between this set and the set of positive integers, no such one-to-one correspondence is a member of the model. Thus the model considers its set of real numbers to be uncountable, or more precisely, the first-order sentence that says the set of real numbers is uncountable is true within the model. In 1963, Paul Cohen used countable models to prove his independence theorems.

== See also ==
- Cantor's theorem

== Bibliography ==
- Arkhangel'skii, A. V.; Fedorchuk, V. V. (1990), "The basic concepts and constructions of general topology", in Arkhangel'skii, A. V.; Pontryagin, L. S. (eds.), General Topology I, New York, Berlin: Springer-Verlag, pp. 1–90, ISBN 978-0-387-18178-3.
- Audin, Michèle (2011), Remembering Sofya Kovalevskaya, London: Springer, ISBN 978-0-85729-928-4.
- Bell, Eric Temple (1937), Men of Mathematics, New York: Simon & Schuster. Reprinted, 1984, ISBN 978-0-671-62818-5.
- Birkhoff, Garrett; Mac Lane, Saunders (1941), A Survey of Modern Algebra, New York: Macmillan. Reprinted, Taylor & Francis, 1997, ISBN 978-1-56881-068-3.
- Burton, David M. (1995), Burton's History of Mathematics (3rd ed.), Dubuque, Iowa: William C. Brown, ISBN 978-0-697-16089-8.
- Cantor, Georg (1874), "Ueber eine Eigenschaft des Inbegriffes aller reellen algebraischen Zahlen", Journal für die Reine und Angewandte Mathematik (in German), 1874 (77): 258–262, doi:10.1515/crll.1874.77.258, S2CID 199545885.
- Cantor, Georg (1878), "Ein Beitrag zur Mannigfaltigkeitslehre", Journal für die Reine und Angewandte Mathematik (in German), 1878 (84): 242–258, doi:10.1515/crll.1878.84.242 (inactive 11 July 2025).
- Cantor, Georg (1879), "Ueber unendliche, lineare Punktmannichfaltigkeiten. 1.", Mathematische Annalen (in German), 15: 1–7, doi:10.1007/bf01444101, S2CID 179177510.
- Chowdhary, K. R. (2015), Fundamentals of Discrete Mathematical Structures (3rd ed.), Delhi, India: PHI Learning, ISBN 978-81-203-5074-8.
- Cohen, Paul J. (1963), "The Independence of the Continuum Hypothesis", Proceedings of the National Academy of Sciences of the United States of America, 50 (6): 1143–1148, Bibcode:1963PNAS...50.1143C, doi:10.1073/pnas.50.6.1143, PMC 221287, PMID 16578557.
- Dasgupta, Abhijit (2014), Set Theory: With an Introduction to Real Point Sets, New York: Springer, ISBN 978-1-4614-8853-8.
- Dauben, Joseph (1979), Georg Cantor: His Mathematics and Philosophy of the Infinite, Cambridge, Mass.: Harvard University Press, ISBN 978-0-674-34871-4.
- Dauben, Joseph (1993), "Georg Cantor and the Battle for Transfinite Set Theory" (PDF), 9th ACMS Conference Proceedings.
- Edwards, Harold M. (1989), "Kronecker's Views on the Foundations of Mathematics", in Rowe, David E.; McCleary, John (eds.), The History of Modern Mathematics, Volume 1, New York: Academic Press, pp. 67–77, ISBN 978-0-12-599662-4.
- Ewald, William B., ed. (1996), From Immanuel Kant to David Hilbert: A Source Book in the Foundations of Mathematics, Volume 2, New York: Oxford University Press, ISBN 978-0-19-850536-5.
- Ferreirós, José (1993), "On the relations between Georg Cantor and Richard Dedekind", Historia Mathematica, 20 (4): 343–363, doi:10.1006/hmat.1993.1030.
- Ferreirós, José (2007), Labyrinth of Thought: A History of Set Theory and Its Role in Mathematical Thought (2nd revised ed.), Basel: Birkhäuser, ISBN 978-3-7643-8349-7.
- Fraenkel, Abraham (1930), "Georg Cantor", Jahresbericht der Deutschen Mathematiker-Vereinigung (in German), 39: 189–266.
- Grattan-Guinness, Ivor (1971), "The Correspondence between Georg Cantor and Philip Jourdain", Jahresbericht der Deutschen Mathematiker-Vereinigung, 73: 111–130.
- Gray, Robert (1994), "Georg Cantor and Transcendental Numbers" (PDF), American Mathematical Monthly, 101 (9): 819–832, doi:10.2307/2975129, JSTOR 2975129, MR 1300488, Zbl 0827.01004, archived from the original (PDF) on 2022-01-21.
- Hardy, Godfrey; Wright, E. M. (1938), An Introduction to the Theory of Numbers, Oxford: Clarendon Press.
- Havil, Julian (2012), The Irrationals, Princeton, Oxford: Princeton University Press, ISBN 978-0-691-16353-6.
- Hawkins, Thomas (1970), Lebesgue's Theory of Integration, Madison, Wisconsin: University of Wisconsin Press, ISBN 978-0-299-05550-9.
- Jarvis, Frazer (2014), Algebraic Number Theory, New York: Springer, ISBN 978-3-319-07544-0.
- Kanamori, Akihiro (2012), "Set Theory from Cantor to Cohen" (PDF), in Gabbay, Dov M.; Kanamori, Akihiro; Woods, John H. (eds.), Sets and Extensions in the Twentieth Century, Amsterdam, Boston: Cambridge University Press, pp. 1–71, ISBN 978-0-444-51621-3.
- Kaplansky, Irving (1972), Set Theory and Metric Spaces, Boston: Allyn and Bacon, ISBN 978-0-8284-0298-9.
- Kelley, John L. (1991), General Topology, New York: Springer, ISBN 978-3-540-90125-9.
- LeVeque, William J. (1956), Topics in Number Theory, vol. I, Reading, Massachusetts: Addison-Wesley. (Reprinted by Dover Publications, 2002, ISBN 978-0-486-42539-9.)
- Noether, Emmy; Cavaillès, Jean, eds. (1937), Briefwechsel Cantor-Dedekind (in German), Paris: Hermann.
- Perron, Oskar (1921), Irrationalzahlen (in German), Leipzig, Berlin: W. de Gruyter, OCLC 4636376.
- Sheppard, Barnaby (2014), The Logic of Infinity, Cambridge: Cambridge University Press, ISBN 978-1-107-67866-8.
- Spivak, Michael (1967), Calculus, London: W. A. Benjamin, ISBN 978-0914098911.
- Stewart, Ian (2015), Galois Theory (4th ed.), Boca Raton, Florida: CRC Press, ISBN 978-1-4822-4582-0.
- Stewart, Ian; Tall, David (2015), The Foundations of Mathematics (2nd ed.), New York: Oxford University Press, ISBN 978-0-19-870644-1.
- Weisstein, Eric W., ed. (2003), "Continued Fraction", CRC Concise Encyclopedia of Mathematics, Boca Raton, Florida: Chapman & Hall/CRC, ISBN 978-1-58488-347-0.
