= Skolem's paradox =

Mathematical logic concept

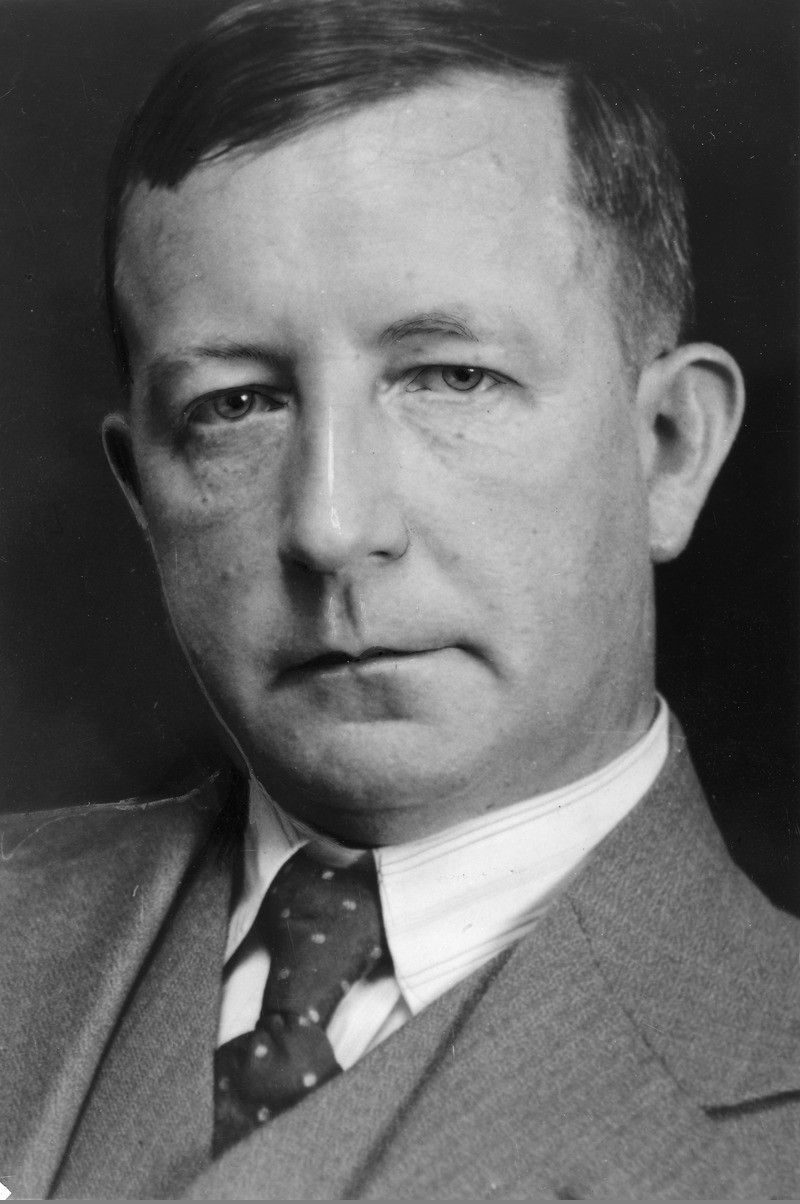
Thoralf Skolem, after whom the paradox is named

In mathematical logic and philosophy, Skolem's paradox is the apparent contradiction that a countable model of first-order set theory could contain an uncountable set. The paradox arises from part of the Löwenheim–Skolem theorem; Thoralf Skolem was the first to discuss the seemingly contradictory aspects of the theorem, and to discover the relativity of set-theoretic notions now known as non-absoluteness. Although it is not an actual antinomy like Russell's paradox, the result is typically called a paradox and was described as a "paradoxical state of affairs" by Skolem.

In model theory, a model corresponds to a specific interpretation of a formal language or theory. It consists of a domain (a set of objects) and an interpretation of the symbols and formulas in the language, such that the axioms of the theory are satisfied within this structure. The Löwenheim–Skolem theorem shows that any model of set theory in first-order logic, if it is consistent, has an equivalent model that is countable. This appears contradictory, because Georg Cantor proved that there exist sets which are not countable. Thus the seeming contradiction is that a model that is itself countable, and which therefore contains only countable sets, satisfies the first-order sentence that intuitively states "there are uncountable sets".

A mathematical explanation of the paradox, showing that it is not a true contradiction in mathematics, was first given in 1922 by Skolem. He explained that the countability of a set is not absolute, but relative to the model in which the cardinality is measured. Skolem's work was harshly received by Ernst Zermelo, who argued against the limitations of first-order logic and Skolem's notion of "relativity," but the result quickly came to be accepted by the mathematical community.

The philosophical implications of Skolem's paradox have received much study. One line of inquiry questions whether it is accurate to claim that any first-order sentence actually states "there are uncountable sets". This line of thought can be extended to question whether any set is uncountable in an absolute sense. More recently, scholars such as Hilary Putnam have introduced the paradox and Skolem's concept of relativity to the study of the philosophy of language.

== Background ==
One of the earliest results in set theory, published by Cantor in 1874, was the existence of different sizes, or cardinalities, of infinite sets. An infinite set $X$ is called countable if there is a function that gives a one-to-one correspondence between $X$ and the natural numbers, and is uncountable if there is no such correspondence function. In 1874, Cantor proved that the real numbers were uncountable; in 1891, he proved by his diagonal argument the more general result known as Cantor's theorem: for every set $S$, the power set of $S$ cannot be in bijection with $S$ itself. When Zermelo proposed his axioms for set theory in 1908, he proved Cantor's theorem from them to demonstrate their strength.

In 1915, Leopold Löwenheim gave the first proof of what Skolem would prove more generally in 1920 and 1922, the Löwenheim–Skolem theorem. Löwenheim showed that any first-order sentence with a model also has a model with a countable domain; Skolem generalized this to infinite sets of sentences. The downward form of the Löwenheim–Skolem theorem shows that if a countable first-order collection of axioms is satisfied by an infinite structure, then the same axioms are satisfied by some countably infinite structure. Since the first-order versions of standard axioms of set theory (such as Zermelo–Fraenkel set theory) are a countable collection of axioms, this implies that if these axioms are satisfiable, they are satisfiable in some countable model.

== The result and its implications ==
In 1922, Skolem pointed out the seeming contradiction between the Löwenheim–Skolem theorem, which implies that there is a countable model of Zermelo's axioms, and Cantor's theorem, which states that uncountable sets exist, and which is provable from Zermelo's axioms. "So far as I know," Skolem wrote, "no one has called attention to this peculiar and apparently paradoxical state of affairs. By virtue of the axioms we can prove the existence of higher cardinalities... How can it be, then, that the entire domain B [a countable model of Zermelo's axioms] can already be enumerated by means of the finite positive integers?"

However, this is only an apparent paradox. In the context of a specific model of set theory, the term "set" does not refer to an arbitrary set, but only to a set that is actually included in the model. The definition of countability requires that a certain one-to-one correspondence between a set and the natural numbers must exist. This correspondence itself is a set. Skolem resolved the paradox by concluding that such a set does not necessarily exist in a countable model; that is, countability is "relative" to a model, and countable, first-order models are incomplete.

Though Skolem gave his result with respect to Zermelo's axioms, it holds for any standard first-order theory of sets, such as ZFC. Consider Cantor's theorem as a long formula in the formal language of ZFC. If ZFC has a model, call this model $\mathrm{M}$ and its domain $\mathbb{M}$. The interpretation of the element symbol $\in$, or $\mathcal{I} ( \in )$, is a set of ordered pairs of elements of $\mathbb{M}$—in other words, $\mathcal{I} ( \in )$ is a subset of $\mathbb{M} \times \mathbb{M}$. Since the Löwenheim–Skolem theorem guarantees that $\mathbb{M}$ is countable, then so must be $\mathbb{M} \times \mathbb{M}$. Two special elements of $\mathbb{M}$ model the natural numbers $\mathbb{N}$ and the power set of the natural numbers $\mathcal{P} ( \mathbb{N} )$. There is only a countably infinite set of ordered pairs in $\mathcal{I} ( \in )$ of the form $\langle x , \mathcal{P} ( \mathbb{N} ) \rangle$, because $\mathbb{M} \times \mathbb{M}$ is countable. That is, only countably many elements of $\mathbb{M}$ model members of the uncountable set $\mathcal{P} ( \mathbb{N} )$. However, there is no contradiction with Cantor's theorem, because what it states is simply that no element of $\mathbb{M}$ models a bijective function from $\mathbb{N}$ to $\mathcal{P} ( \mathbb{N} )$.

Skolem used the term "relative" to describe when the same set could be countable in one model of set theory and not countable in another: relative to one model, no enumerating function can put some set into correspondence with the natural numbers, but relative to another model, this correspondence may exist. He described this as the "most important" result in his 1922 paper. Contemporary set theorists describe concepts that do not depend on the choice of a transitive model as absolute. From their point of view, Skolem's paradox simply shows that countability is not an absolute property in first-order logic.

Skolem described his work as a critique of (first-order) set theory, intended to illustrate its weakness as a foundational system:

I believed that it was so clear that axiomatization in terms of sets was not a satisfactory ultimate foundation of mathematics that mathematicians would, for the most part, not be very much concerned with it. But in recent times I have seen to my surprise that so many mathematicians think that these axioms of set theory provide the ideal foundation for mathematics; therefore it seemed to me that the time had come for a critique.

— Thoralf Skolem, Some remarks on axiomatized set theory (1922) (Note: Translated from the original German Einige Bemerkungen zur axiomatischen Begründung der Mengenlehre)

== Reception by the mathematical community ==
It took some time for the theory of first-order logic to be developed enough for mathematicians to understand the cause of Skolem's result; no resolution of the paradox was widely accepted during the 1920s. In 1928, Abraham Fraenkel still described the result as an antinomy:

Neither have the books yet been closed on the antinomy, nor has agreement on its significance and possible solution yet been reached.

— Abraham Fraenkel, Introduction to set theory (1928) (Note: Translated from the original German Einleitung in die Mengenlehre)

In 1925, John von Neumann presented a novel axiomatization of set theory, which developed into NBG set theory. Very much aware of Skolem's 1922 paper, von Neumann investigated countable models of his axioms in detail. In his concluding remarks, von Neumann commented that there is no categorical axiomatization of set theory, or any other theory with an infinite model. Speaking of the impact of Skolem's paradox, he wrote:

At present we can do no more than note that we have one more reason here to entertain reservations about set theory and that for the time being no way of rehabilitating this theory is known.

— John von Neumann, An axiomatization of set theory (1925) (Note: Translated from the original German Eine Axiomatisierung der Mengenlehre)

Zermelo at first considered Skolem's paradox a hoax, and he spoke against Skolem's "relativism" in 1931. Skolem's result applies only to what is now called first-order logic, but Zermelo argued against the finitary metamathematics that underlie first-order logic, as Zermelo was a mathematical Platonist who opposed intuitionism and finitism in mathematics. Zermelo believed in a kind of infinite Platonic ideal of logic, and he held that mathematics had an inherently infinite character. Zermelo argued that his axioms should instead be studied in second-order logic, a setting in which Skolem's result does not apply. Zermelo published a second-order axiomatization of set theory in 1930. Zermelo's further work on the foundations of set theory after Skolem's paper led to his discovery of the cumulative hierarchy and formalization of infinitary logic.

The surprise with which set theorists met Skolem's paradox in the 1920s was a product of their times. Gödel's completeness theorem and the compactness theorem, theorems which illuminate the way that first-order logic behaves and established its finitary nature, were not first proved until 1929. Leon Henkin's proof of the completeness theorem, which is now a standard technique for constructing countable models of a consistent first-order theory, was not presented until 1947. Thus, in the 1920s, the particular properties of first-order logic that permit Skolem's paradox were not yet understood. It is now known that Skolem's paradox is unique to first-order logic; if set theory is studied using higher-order logic with full semantics, then it does not have any countable models. By the time that Zermelo was writing his final refutation of the paradox in 1937, the community of logicians and set theorists had largely accepted the incompleteness of first-order logic. Zermelo left this refutation unfinished.

== Later opinions ==
Later mathematical logicians did not view Skolem's paradox a fatal flaw in set theory. Stephen Cole Kleene described the result as "not a paradox in the sense of outright contradiction, but rather a kind of anomaly". After surveying Skolem's argument that the result is not contradictory, Kleene concluded: "there is no absolute notion of countability". Geoffrey Hunter described the contradiction as "hardly even a paradox". Fraenkel et al. claimed that contemporary mathematicians are no more bothered by the lack of categoricity of first-order theories than they are bothered by the conclusion of Gödel's incompleteness theorem: that no consistent, effective, and sufficiently strong set of first-order axioms is complete.

Other mathematicians such as Reuben Goodstein and Hao Wang have gone so far as to adopt what is called a "Skolemite" view: that not only does the Löwenheim-Skolem theorem prove that set-theoretic notions of countability are relative to a model, but that every set is countable from some "absolute" perspective. L. E. J. Brouwer was another early adherent to the idea of absolute countability, arguing from the vantage of mathematical intuitionism that all sets are countable. Both the Skolemite view and Brouwer's intuitionism stand in opposition to mathematical Platonism, but Carl Posy denies the idea that Brouwer's position was a reaction to earlier set-theoretic paradoxes. Skolem was another mathematical intuitionist, but he denied that his ideas were inspired by Brouwer.

Countable models of Zermelo–Fraenkel set theory have become common tools in the study of set theory. Paul Cohen's method for extending set theory, forcing, is often explained in terms of countable models, and was described by Akihiro Kanamori as a kind of extension of Skolem's paradox. The fact that these countable models of Zermelo–Fraenkel set theory still satisfy the theorem that there are uncountable sets is not considered a pathology; Jean van Heijenoort described it as "not a paradox...[but] a novel and unexpected feature of formal systems".

Hilary Putnam considered Skolem's result a paradox, but one of the philosophy of language rather than of set theory or formal logic. He extended Skolem's paradox to argue that not only are set-theoretic notions of membership relative, but semantic notions of language are relative: there is no "absolute" model for terms and predicates in language. Timothy Bays argued that Putnam's argument applies the downward Löwenheim-Skolem theorem incorrectly, while Tim Button argued that Putnam's claim stands despite the use or misuse of the Löwenheim-Skolem theorem. Appeals to Skolem's paradox have been made several times in the philosophy of science, with scholars making use of Skolem's idea of the relativity of model structures.

== See also ==
- Paradoxes of set theory

== Bibliography ==
- Baldwin, John (2017). "The Explanatory Power of a New Proof: Henkin's Completeness Proof" (PDF). Truth, Existence and Explanation: FilMat Studies in the Philosophy of Mathematics. Springer: 147–162.
- Bays, Timothy (2001). "On Putnam and His Models". The Journal of Philosophy. 98 (7). Journal of Philosophy, Inc.: 1–32. doi:10.2307/2678439. JSTOR 2678439.
- Bays, Timothy (2007). "The Mathematics of Skolem's Paradox" (PDF). Philosophy of Logic. Elsevier. pp. 615–648.
- Button, Tim (2011). "The Metamathematics of Putnam's Model-Theoretic Arguments". Erkenntnis. 74 (3). Springer: 321–349. doi:10.1007/s10670-011-9270-6. JSTOR 41476692.
- Cantor, Georg (1874). "Ueber eine Eigenschaft des Inbegriffes aller reellen algebraischen Zahlen" (PDF). Journal für die reine und angewandte Mathematik (in German). 1874 (77): 258–262. doi:10.1515/crll.1874.77.258. S2CID 199545885. Archived (PDF) from the original on 2023-01-04.
- Dawson, John W (1993). "The Compactness of First-Order Logic: From Gödel to Lindström". History and Philosophy of Logic. 14 (1). Taylor & Francis: 15–37. doi:10.1080/01445349308837208.
- Eklund, Matti (1996). "On How Logic Became First-Order" (PDF). Nordic Journal of Philosophical Logic. 1 (2): 147–167.
- Ewald, William B., ed. (1996). From Immanuel Kant to David Hilbert: A Source Book in the Foundations of Mathematics. Vol. 2. New York: Oxford University Press. ISBN 019853471X.
- Fraenkel, Abraham; Bar-Hillel, Yehoshua; Levy, Azriel; van Dalen, Dirk (1973). Foundations of Set Theory. North-Holland.
- Goodstein, R. L. (1963). "The Significance of Incompleteness Theorems". The British Journal for the Philosophy of Science. 14 (55). Oxford University Press, The British Society for the Philosophy of Science: 208–220. doi:10.1093/bjps/XIV.55.208. JSTOR 685241.
- Haaparanta, Leila, ed. (2009). The Development of Modern Logic. Oxford University Press. ISBN 978-0-19-513731-6.
- Hanna, Robert (2024). "A Neo-Organicist Approach to the Löwenheim-Skolem Theorem and "Skolem's Paradox"". Science for Humans: Mind, Life, The Formal-&-Natural Sciences, and A New Concept of Nature. Springer Nature Switzerland. pp. 105–108. doi:10.1007/978-3-031-61113-1_9. ISBN 978-3-031-61113-1.
- Hodges, Wilfrid (1985). Building Models by Games (illustrated ed.). Cambridge University Press. ISBN 9780521317160.
- Hunter, Geoffrey (1996) [1971]. Metalogic: An Introduction to the Metatheory of Standard First-Order Logic. University of California Press (published 1973). ISBN 9780520023567. OCLC 36312727. (accessible to patrons with print disabilities)
- Kanamori, Akihiro (1996). "The Mathematical Development of Set Theory from Cantor to Cohen". The Bulletin of Symbolic Logic. 2 (1): 1–71. doi:10.2307/421046. JSTOR 421046.
- Kanamori, Akihiro (2004). "Zermelo and Set Theory". The Bulletin of Symbolic Logic. 10 (4): 487–553. doi:10.2178/bsl/1102083759. ISSN 1079-8986. JSTOR 3216738. MR 2136635. S2CID 231795240.
- Kleene, Stephen Cole (1967). Mathematical Logic. Wiley. ISBN 9780471490333.
- Klenk, Virginia (1976). "Intended Models and the Löwenheim-Skolem Theorem". Journal of Philosophical Logic. 5 (4). Springer: 475–489. doi:10.1007/BF02109439. JSTOR 30226157.
- Kneale, William; Kneale, Martha (1962). The Development of Logic. Oxford University Press.
- Kunen, Kenneth (1980). Set Theory: An Introduction to Independence Proofs. Amsterdam: North-Holland. ISBN 978-0-444-85401-8.
- Moore, Gregory H (1980). "Beyond First-Order Logic: The Historical Interplay Between Mathematical Logic and Axiomatic Set Theory". History and Philosophy of Logic. 1 (1–2). Taylor & Francis: 95–137. doi:10.1080/01445348008837006.
- Nourani, Cyrus (2014). A Functorial Model Theory: Newer Applications to Algebraic Topology, Descriptive Sets, and Computing Categories Topos. CRC Press. ISBN 978-1-926895-92-5.
- Penchev, Vasil (2020). "Skolem's "Paradox" as Logic of Ground: The Mutual Foundation of Both Proper and Improper Interpretations". Epistemology eJournal. 13 (19). Elsevier: 1–16.
- Posy, Carl (1974). "Brouwer's Constructivism". Synthese. 27 (1–2). Kluwer Academic Publishers: 125–159. doi:10.1007/bf00660893. JSTOR 20114910.
- Putnam, Hilary (Sep 1980). "Models and Reality" (PDF). The Journal of Symbolic Logic. 45 (3): 464–482. doi:10.2307/2273415. JSTOR 2273415. S2CID 18831300.
- Resnik, Michael David (1966). "On Skolem's Paradox". The Journal of Philosophy. 63 (15). Journal of Philosophy, Inc.: 425–438. doi:10.2307/2024063. JSTOR 2024063.
- Shapiro, Stewart, ed. (1996). The Limits of Logic: Higher-Order Logic and the Lowenheim-Skolem Theorem. Routledge. ISBN 9781855217317.
- van Dalen, Dirk; Ebbinghaus, Heinz-Dieter (Jun 2000). "Zermelo and the Skolem Paradox". The Bulletin of Symbolic Logic. 6 (2): 145–161. CiteSeerX 10.1.1.137.3354. doi:10.2307/421203. hdl:1874/27769. JSTOR 421203. S2CID 8530810.
- van Heijenoort, Jean, ed. (1967). From Frege to Gödel: A Source Book in Mathematical Logic, 1879–1931. Harvard University Press.
  - Löwenheim, Leopold. "On Possibilities in the Calculus of Relatives". In van Heijenoort (1967), pp. 228–251.
  - Skolem, Thoralf. "Some Remarks on Axiomatized Set Theory". In van Heijenoort (1967), pp. 290–301.
  - Zermelo, Ernst. "Investigations in the Foundations of Set Theory I". In van Heijenoort (1967), pp. 199–215.
- von Neumann, John (1925). "Eine Axiomatisierung der Mengenlehre". Journal für die reine und angewandte Mathematik (in German). 154: 219–240. doi:10.1515/crll.1925.154.219.
