= Charles W. Curtis =

American mathematician and historian (1926–2026)

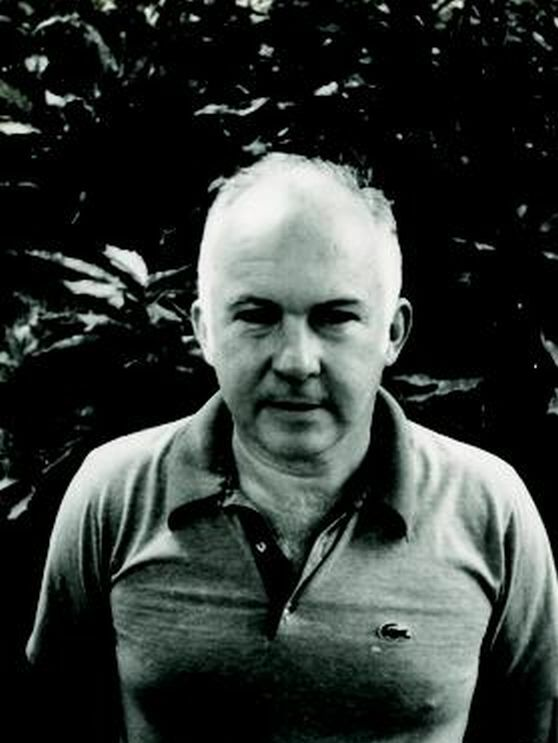
Charles W. Curtis

Charles Whittlesey Curtis (October 13, 1926 – May 3, 2026) was an American mathematician and historian of mathematics, known for his work in finite group theory and representation theory. He was a professor of mathematics at the University of Oregon.

== Life and career ==
Curtis received a bachelor's degree from Bowdoin College in 1948, and his Ph.D. from Yale University in 1951, under the supervision of Nathan Jacobson. He taught at the University of Wisconsin–Madison from 1954 to 1963. Subsequently, he moved to the University of Oregon, where he was an emeritus professor.

While at Yale, on June 17, 1950 in Cheshire, Connecticut, Curtis married his wife Elizabeth, a kindergarten teacher and childcare provider. At the time of their 50th anniversary in 2000, they had three grandchildren.

In 2012 he became a fellow of the American Mathematical Society.

Curtis died in Eugene, Oregon, on May 3, 2026, at the age of 99.

== Research ==
Curtis introduced Curtis duality, a duality operation on the characters of a reductive group over a finite field. His book with Irving Reiner (Curtis & Reiner 1962) was the standard text on representation theory for many years.

== Publications ==
- Curtis, Charles W. (1999), Pioneers of Representation Theory: Frobenius, Burnside, Schur, and Brauer, History of Mathematics, Providence, R.I.: American Mathematical Society, ISBN 978-0-8218-2677-5.
- Curtis, Charles W.; Reiner, Irving (1962), Representation theory of finite groups and associative algebras, Pure and Applied Mathematics, Vol. XI, Interscience Publishers, a division of John Wiley & Sons, New York-London, ISBN 978-0-8218-4066-5, MR 0144979
- Curtis, Charles W.; Reiner, Irving (1981), Methods of representation theory. Vol. I, New York: John Wiley & Sons, ISBN 978-0-471-18994-7, MR 0632548
- Curtis, Charles W.; Reiner, Irving (1987), Methods of representation theory. Vol. II, New York: John Wiley & Sons, ISBN 978-0-471-88871-0
- Curtis, Charles W. (1974), Linear Algebra, Pearson Allyn & Bacon, ISBN 978-0205040087
