= Randall J. LeVeque =

American mathematician

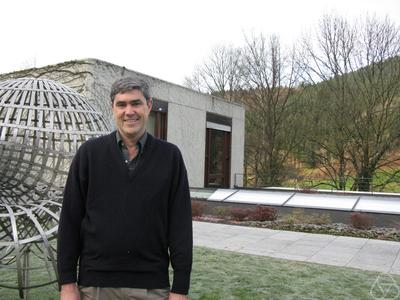
- Randall J. LeVeque in 2008
- Scientific career
- Fields: Mathematics, Applied Mathematics
- Workplaces: University of Washington; University of California, Los Angeles; Courant Institute
- Doctoral advisor: Joseph Oliger

Randall J.. LeVeque is a Professor of Applied Mathematics at University of Washington who works in many fields including numerical analysis, computational fluid dynamics, and mathematical theory of conservation laws. Among other contributions, he is lead developer of the open source software project Clawpack for solving hyperbolic partial differential equations using the finite volume method. With Zhilin Li, he has also devised a numerical technique called the immersed interface method for solving problems with elastic boundaries or surface tension.

He was an invited speaker at the 2006 International Congress of Mathematicians held in Madrid. He became a fellow of the Society for Industrial and Applied Mathematics in 2010, fellow of the American Mathematical Society in 2013, and a member of the National Academy of Sciences in 2021.

LeVeque is a son of the well-known mathematician William J. LeVeque.

== Education and career ==
LeVeque received his B.A. in mathematics from University of California, San Diego in 1977. He then continued to Stanford University to get his Ph.D. in computer science in 1982. Following a postdoctoral fellowship at the Courant Institute and the Hedrick Assistant Professorship at University of California, Los Angeles, he has been a faculty member at the University of Washington since 1985. He has advised twenty three PhD students.

== Books ==
LeVeque has authored several textbooks and monographs:

- Finite Volume Methods for Hyperbolic Problems, Cambridge University Press (2002). ISBN 0-521-00924-3
- Numerical Methods for Conservation Laws, 1st ed. (1992), 2nd ed., Birkhäuser Basel (2005). ISBN 3-7643-2723-5
- Computational Methods for Astrophysical Fluid Flow, Springer (1998). ISBN 3-540-64448-2
- Finite Difference Methods for Ordinary and Partial Differential Equations, Steady State and Time Dependent Problems, SIAM (2007). ISBN 978-0-89871-629-0
