= Mary P. Dolciani =

American mathematician

Mary P. Dolciani (1923–1985) was an American mathematician, known for her work with secondary-school mathematics teachers.

== Education and career ==
During World War II, Dolciani worked for the U.S. Government on classified projects at Fort Monmouth.

Dolciani earned her Bachelor of Arts degree (B.A.) at Hunter College in New York City. She completed her Doctor of Philosophy (Ph.D.) degree at Cornell University in 1947, with B. W. Jones as her thesis advisor. At Cornell she was an Erastus Brooks fellow and an Olmsted fellow.

Dolciani taught briefly at Vassar College in Poughkeepsie before returning to Hunter, where she spent the next forty years. Dolciani taught mathematics there, and at times, she also served as a Dean or the Provost. She later became Dean for Academic Development at The City University of New York.

Dolciani was a member of the Mathematical Association of America (MAA).

== Mathematics contributions ==
Beginning in the 1960s, Dolciani wrote a series of high school mathematics textbook, Structure and Method, which have been translated into French and Spanish. In 2000–2010 the books experienced a resurgence of popularity.

Shortly before her death in 1985, Dolciani also co-wrote (along with two other mathematics educators) Pre-Algebra: An Accelerated Course. This textbook was widely used in the later 1980s through the 1990s. In addition to teaching the pure mathematics, it emphasized the usefulness of algebra in various practical applications.

Although Dolciani is not well known by the general public, she was influential in developing the basic modern method used for teaching basic algebra in the United States (called "Dolciani algebra", which teaches it on the basis of drill like arithmetic, rather than on the basis of proofs as in Euclidean geometry). Dolciani also popularized the short-form names of the Properties that are familiar to many high school algebra students, e.g. the "Zero Property".

In 1982, Dr. Mary P. Dolciani Halloran, with her husband James J. Halloran and Eugene J. Callahan as Trustees, established the Mary P. Dolciani Halloran Foundation to further the study of mathematics and mathematics education.

== Legacy ==
Dolciani died in 1985.

The American Mathematical Society publishes a series of mathematical books named for her: The Dolciani Mathematical Expositions.

The Mathematical Association of America's headquarters building in Washington D.C. is named The Dolciani Mathematical Center in her honor, and a series of expository essays have been given in her honor called the Dolciani Mathematical Expositions.

The Mathematical Association of America has given the Mary P. Dolciani Award annually since 2012 for distinguished contributions to teaching, and the American Mathematical Society has given a different award, the Mary P. Dolciani Prize for Excellence in Research, every other year beginning in 2019.

== Sources ==
- Denson, Philinda Stern (1989). A comparison of the effectiveness of the Saxon and Dolciani texts and theories about the teaching of high school Algebra (PhD thesis). Claremont Graduate University.
