= Burton Wadsworth Jones =

American mathematician

- Born: 11 October 1902; Redwood Falls, Minnesota
- Died: 8 December 1983 (aged 81); Wellesley, Massachusetts
- Other names: Jones, Burton W.; Jones, B. W
- Scientific career
- Fields: Mathematician
- Doctoral advisor: Leonard Eugene Dickson
- Doctoral students: Irving Reiner; Mary P. Dolciani; William J. LeVeque

Burton Wadsworth Jones (1 October 1902 – 8 December 1983) was an American mathematician, known for his work on quadratic forms.

B. W. Jones was born in Redwood Falls, Minnesota. He received his BA in 1923 from Grinell College, his MA in 1924 from Harvard University, and his PhD in mathematics in 1928 from the University of Chicago under L. E. Dickson. Jones was a mathematics professor at Cornell University from 1930 to 1948. At Cornell, he supervised the doctoral dissertations of four mathematicians: Irma Moses Reiner (1946), Irving Reiner (1947), Mary Dolciani (1947), and William J. LeVeque (1948). Jones was a member of the University of Colorado Boulder faculty from 1948 to his retirement in 1971; he was chair of the mathematics department from 1949 to 1963.

Jones was honored by being selected to write the Carus Monograph Number 10, entitled The Arithmetic Theory of Quadratic Forms. He received the Mathematical Association of America (MAA) Distinguished Service Award in 1971. In 1991 the Rocky Mountain section of the MAA honored the memory of B. W. Jones by naming their yearly Distinguished Teaching Award after him. He died in Wellesley, Massachusetts.

== Publications ==
- Jones, B. W. (1930). "Certain quinary forms related to the sum of five squares" (PDF). Bull. Amer. Math. Soc. 36 (10): 721–734. doi:10.1090/s0002-9904-1930-05047-8. MR 1562043.
- Jones, Burton W. (1931). "A new definition of genus for ternary quadratic forms". Trans. Amer. Math. Soc. 33 (1): 92–110. doi:10.1090/s0002-9947-1931-1501577-6. MR 1501577.
- Jones, Burton W. (1931). "The regularity of a genus of positive ternary quadratic forms". Trans. Amer. Math. Soc. 33 (1): 111–124. doi:10.1090/s0002-9947-1931-1501578-8. MR 1501578.
- with Gordon Pall: Jones, Burton W.; Pall, Gordon (1939). "Regular and semi-regular positive ternary quadratic forms". Acta Mathematica. 70 (3–4): 165–191. doi:10.1007/bf02547347. S2CID 119668878.
- Jones, Burton W. (1942). "An extension of a theorem of Witt". Bull. Amer. Math. Soc. 48 (2): 133–142. doi:10.1090/s0002-9904-1942-07625-7. MR 0006139.
- Jones, B. W. (1949). "A theorem on integral symmetric matrices" (PDF). Bull. Amer. Math. Soc. 55 (6): 620–622. doi:10.1090/s0002-9904-1949-09265-0. MR 0030564.
- with William Hetherington Durfee: "A theorem on quadratic forms over the 2-adic integers" (PDF). Bull. Amer. Math. Soc. 55: 756–762. 1949. doi:10.1090/s0002-9904-1949-09276-5. MR 0031522.
- with Edward Harold Hadlock: Jones, Burton W.; Hadlock, E. H. (1953). "Properly primitive ternary indefinite quadratic genera of more than one class". Proc. Amer. Math. Soc. 4 (4): 539–543. doi:10.1090/s0002-9939-1953-0056647-9. MR 0056647.
