= Irving Reiner =

American mathematician

Irving Rainer
- Born: 8 February 1924; Brooklyn, New York, US
- Died: 28 October 1986 (aged 62); Urbana, Illinois, US
- Education: Cornell University (Ph.D., 1947)
- Scientific career
- Fields: Mathematician
- Workplaces: University of Illinois
- Thesis: A Generalization of Meyer's Theorem (1947)
- Doctoral advisor: Burton Wadsworth Jones

Irving Reiner (February 8, 1924 in Brooklyn, New York – October 28, 1986 in Urbana, Illinois) was a mathematician at the University of Illinois who worked on representation theory. He solved the problem of finding which abelian groups have a finite number of indecomposable modules. His book with Charles W. Curtis, (Curtis & Reiner 1962), was for many years the standard text on representation theory.

== Life ==
Reiner obtained his Ph.D. from Cornell University in 1947; his dissertation, A generalization of Meyer's theorem, was written under the supervision of Burton Wadsworth Jones. He met another one of Jones' students, Irma Moses, leading to their marriage in August 1948 and two children, Peter Reiner and David Reiner.

Reiner met Hua Luogeng while at the Institute for Advanced Study and subsequently collaborated on three joint papers:

- On the generators of the symplectic modular group (1949);
- Automorphisms of the unimodular group (1951);
- Automorphisms of the projective unimodular group (1952).

They remained friends as they attended the University of Illinois, before Hua returned to his native China and Reiner remained in Illinois.

== Bibliography ==
- Curtis, Charles W.; Reiner, Irving (1962), Representation theory of finite groups and associative algebras, Pure and Applied Mathematics, Vol. XI, Interscience Publishers, a division of John Wiley & Sons, New York-London, ISBN 978-0-8218-4066-5, MR 0144979
- Roggenkamp, Klaus W.; Reiner, Irving (1979), Orders and their applications: Proceedings of a conference held in Oberwolfach, West Germany, June 3-9, 1984, Lecture Notes in Mathematics, Springer-Verlag, ISBN 9783540396017
- Curtis, Charles W.; Reiner, Irving (1990), Methods of Representation Theory: With Applications to Finite Groups and Orders, Wiley Classics Library, John Wiley & Sons, New York-London, ISBN 0471523674
