= Geoffrey Hunter (logician) =

British professor, philosopher, and logician (1925-2000)

- Born: 14 December 1925; Leeds, West Yorkshire, England
- Died: 8 June 2000 (aged 74); Ysbyty Gwynedd, Bangor, Gwynedd, Wales

Philosophical work
- School: Analytic philosophy
- Institutions: University College of Wales, Bangor, Queen's University, University of Leeds, University of St Andrews
- Main interests: Logic, metalogic
- Notable works: Metalogic: An Introduction to the Metatheory of Standard First-Order Logic

Geoffrey Basil Bailey Hunter (14 December 1925 – 8 June 2000) was a British professor, philosopher, and logician. Hunter was Professor Emeritus of the University College of Wales, Bangor, where he was professor from 1978 until he retired in 1992. He also taught at Queen's University Kingston, Ontario (1950–1952) and was a lecturer in Philosophy at the University of Leeds (1952–1965), and reader in Logic at the University of St Andrews (1965–1978). Geoffrey was probably most known for his work titled Metalogic: An Introduction to the Metatheory of Standard First-Order Logic, published in 1971.

== Published work ==
- Hunter, Geoffrey (1971). "Metalogic: An Introduction to the Metatheory of Standard First Order Logic". Macmillan
- Hunter, Geoffrey (1973). "Not Both P and not Q, therefore if P then Q" is not a valid form of argument Mind vol LXXXII:280-280
- Hunter, Geoffrey (1974). "Concepts and Meaning." in Hume and the Enlightenment: essays presented to Ernest Campbell Mossner / edited by William B. Todd
- Hunter, Geoffrey (1980). "What do the Consistency Proofs for Non-Euclidean Geometry Prove?" Analysis:40:79-83.
- Hunter, Geoffrey (1988). "What Computers Can't Do" Philosophy:63:175-189.
- Hunter, Geoffrey (1994). "Platonist Manifesto" Philosophy:69:151-62.
- Hunter, Geoffrey (1995). "The Churchland's Eliminative Materialism : or the Result of Impatience." Philosophical Investigations:18(1):13-30.
- Hunter, Geoffrey (1995). "Quine's Two Dogmas of Empiricism'." Philosophical Investigations 18(4): 305–328.

== See also ==
- Metalogic
