= Nested sequent calculus =

In structural proof theory, the nested sequent calculus is a reformulation of the sequent calculus to allow deep inference.
