= Completeness of atomic initial sequents =

In sequent calculus, the completeness of atomic initial sequents states that initial sequents A ⊢ A (where A is an arbitrary formula) can be derived from only atomic initial sequents p ⊢ p (where p is an atomic formula). This theorem plays a role analogous to eta expansion in lambda calculus, and dual to cut elimination and beta reduction. Typically it can be established by induction on the structure of A, much more easily than cut elimination.
