= Cirquent calculus =

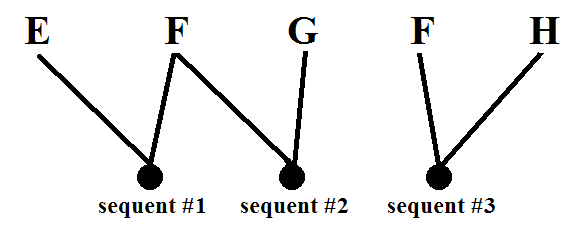
Cirquents can be thought of as collections of sequents with possibly shared elements

Cirquent calculus (circuit sequent calculus) is a proof calculus that combines aspects of sequent calculus and boolean circuits. Its proof-objects are graph-style objects, termed cirquents, as opposed to the traditional tree-style objects such as formulas or sequents. Cirquents come in a variety of forms, but they all share one main characteristic feature, making them different from the more traditional objects of syntactic manipulation. This feature is the ability to explicitly account for possible sharing of subcomponents between different components. The idea is that, just as in a Boolean circuit, the output of a gate can be reused arbitrarily often by subsequent gates, so in a cirquent proof, proven subformulas can be reused.

For instance, it is possible to write an expression where two subexpressions F and E, while neither one is a subexpression of the other, still have a common occurrence of a subexpression G (as opposed to having two different occurrences of G, one in F and one in E).

== Overview ==
The approach was introduced by G. Japaridze as an alternative proof theory capable of "taming" various nontrivial fragments of his computability logic, which had otherwise resisted all axiomatization attempts within the traditional proof-theoretic frameworks. The origin of the term “cirquent” is CIRcuit+seQUENT, as the simplest form of cirquents, while resembling circuits rather than formulas, can be thought of as collections of one-sided sequents (for instance, sequents of a given level of a Gentzen-style proof tree) where some sequents may have shared elements.

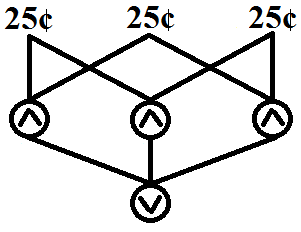
Cirquent for the "two out of three" combination of resources, inexpressible in linear logic

The basic version of cirquent calculus was accompanied with an "abstract resource semantics" and the claim that the latter was an adequate formalization of the resource philosophy traditionally associated with linear logic. Based on that claim and the fact that the semantics induced a logic properly stronger than (affine) linear logic, Japaridze argued that linear logic was incomplete as a logic of resources. Furthermore, he argued that not only the deductive power but also the expressive power of linear logic was weak, for it, unlike cirquent calculus, failed to capture the ubiquitous phenomenon of resource sharing.

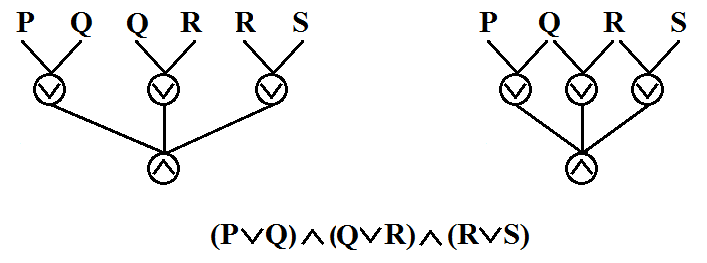
Linear logic understands the displayed formula as the left cirquent, while classical logic as the right cirquent

The resource philosophy of cirquent calculus sees the approaches of linear logic and classical logic as two extremes: the former does not allow any sharing at all, while in the latter “everything is shared that can be shared”. Unlike cirquent calculus, neither approach thus permits mixed cases where some identical subformulas are shared and some not.

Among the later-found applications of cirquent calculus was the use of it to define a semantics for purely propositional independence-friendly logic. The corresponding logic was axiomatized by W. Xu.

Syntactically, cirquent calculi are deep inference systems with the unique feature of subformula-sharing. This feature has been shown to provide speedup for certain proofs. For instance, polynomial size analytic proofs for the propositional pigeonhole principle have been constructed. Only quasipolynomial analytic proofs have been found for this principle in other deep inference systems. In resolution or analytic Gentzen-style systems, the pigeonhole principle is known to have only exponential size proofs.
