= Cedent =

Cedent may refer to:

- In law, the party transferring a personal claim in the act called cession.
  - A Latin term in Civil Law referring to the "assignor" in Assignment (law)
- In logic, the antecedent and succedent of a sequent in sequent calculus are called cedents.
- In insurance, a reinsured.
