= Peter O'Hearn =

Research scientist (born 1963)

Peter O'Hearn FRS FREng
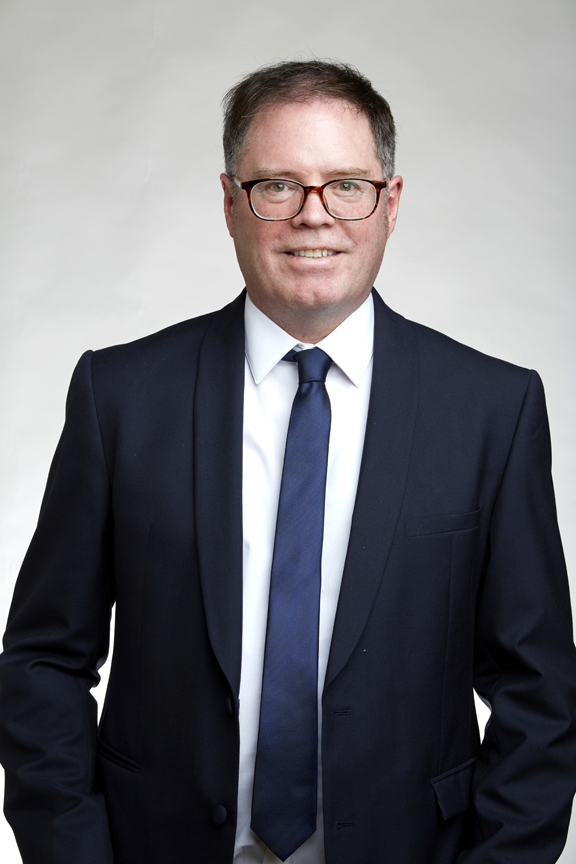
- O'Hearn in 2018
- Born: Peter William O'Hearn; 13 July 1963 (age 63); Halifax, Nova Scotia, Canada
- Citizenship: United Kingdom, Canada
- Education: Dalhousie University; Queen's University
- Known for: Separation logic Bunched logic Infer Static Analyzer
- Awards: IEEE Cybersecurity Award for Practice (2021); Most Influential POPL Paper Award (2019); Honorary Doctor of Laws, Dalhousie University (2018); Fellow of the Royal Society (FRS) (2018); Gödel Prize (2016); Fellow of the Royal Academy of Engineering (FREng) (2016); CAV (Computer Aided Verification) Award (2016); Most Influential POPL Paper Award (2011); Royal Society Wolfson Research Merit Award (2007)
- Scientific career
- Fields: Programming languages Program analysis Formal verification Theoretical computer science
- Workplaces: Meta Platforms; Lacework; University College London; Queen Mary University of London; Syracuse University
- Thesis: Semantics of Non-interference: A natural approach (1992)
- Doctoral advisor: Robert D. Tennent
- Website: www0.cs.ucl.ac.uk/staff/p.ohearn/

Peter William O'Hearn (born 13 July 1963 in Halifax, Nova Scotia), is a researcher at Meta AI (FAIR), and a Professor of Computer science at University College London (UCL). He has made significant contributions to formal methods for program correctness. In recent years these advances have been employed in developing industrial software tools that conduct automated analysis of large industrial codebases.

== Education ==
O'Hearn attained a BSc degree in computer science from Dalhousie University, Halifax, Nova Scotia (1985), followed by MSc (1987) and PhD (1991) degrees from Queen's University, Kingston, Ontario, Canada. His dissertation was on Semantics of Non-interference: A natural approach, supervised by Robert D. Tennent.

== Career and research ==
O'Hearn is best known for separation logic, a theory he developed with John C. Reynolds that unearthed new domains for scaling logical reasoning about code. This built on prior research from O'Hearn and David Pym on logic for resources, termed bunched logic. With Stephen Brookes, Carnegie Mellon University, O'Hearn created Concurrent Separation Logic (CSL), extending the theory further. Tony Hoare, in discussing the grand challenge of program verification, described CSL as "solving two problems...concurrecy and object orientation".

He conducted a study of programming languages which were similar to ALGOL, with his former doctoral advisor Robert D. Tennent, which became the book Algol-Like Languages.

Separation logic has given rise to the Infer Static Analyzer (Facebook Infer), a static program analysis utility developed by O'Hearn's team at Facebook. After 20 plus years in academia, O'Hearn began working at Facebook in 2013 with the acquisition of Monoidics Ltd, a startup he cofounded. Since its inception, Infer has enabled Facebook engineers to resolve tens of thousands of bugs before reaching production. It was open sourced in 2016, and is used by Amazon Inc, Spotify, Mozilla, Uber, and others. In 2017, O'Hearn and the team open sourced RacerD, an automated static race condition detection tool that reduces the time it takes to flag potential problems in concurrent software, as part of the Infer platform.

From 2021-2024 Peter led the development of a Code Security product for the Cybersecurity company Lacework. He returned to Meta to join the AI team in the Fall of 2024.

O'Hearn was an assistant professor at Syracuse University, New York, United States, from 1990 to 1995. He was a reader in computer science at Queen Mary University of London from 1996 to 1999 and then a full professor at Queen Mary until his move to University College London. At UCL he was granted a chair sponsored by the Royal Academy of Engineering and Microsoft Research. In 1997 he was a visiting scientist at Carnegie Mellon University and in 2006 he was a visiting researcher at Microsoft Research Cambridge. He now shares his time working as a researcher at Meta AI (FAIR) and a professor at UCL.

=== Awards and honours ===
In 2007, O'Hearn was granted a Royal Society Wolfson Research Merit Award. In 2011, O'Hearn and Samin Ishtiaq were awarded a Most Influential POPL Paper Award. With Stephen Brookes, Carnegie Mellon University, he was co-recipient of the 2016 Gödel Prize, for the invention of Concurrent Separation Logic. Also in 2016, he was elected Fellow of the Royal Academy of Engineering (FREng) and co-received the annual CAV (Computer Aided Verification) award. In 2018, he was elected Fellow of the Royal Society (FRS), and was bestowed with an Honorary Doctor of Laws from Dalhousie University. January 2019 saw O'Hearn honoured with another Most Influential POPL Paper Award, which he shared with three colleagues. The Institute of Electrical and Electronics Engineers (IEEE) granted O'Hearn and three of his Facebook colleagues an IEEE Cybersecurity Award for Practice at their annual awards ceremony in October, 2021. He was named as an ACM Fellow, in the 2024 class of fellows, "for contributions to the science and engineering of reasoning about programs".
