= Structural proof theory =

Subdiscipline of proof theory

In mathematical logic, structural proof theory is the subdiscipline of proof theory that studies proof calculi that support a notion of analytic proof, a kind of proof whose semantic properties are exposed. When all the theorems of a logic formalised in a proof calculus have analytic proofs, then the proof calculus can be used to demonstrate such things as consistency, provide decision procedures, and allow mathematical or computational witnesses to be extracted as counterparts to theorems, the kind of task that is more often given to model theory.

== Analytic proof ==
The notion of analytic proof was introduced into proof theory by Gerhard Gentzen for the sequent calculus; the analytic proofs are those that are cut-free. His natural deduction calculus also supports a notion of analytic proof, as was shown by Dag Prawitz; the definition is slightly more complex—the analytic proofs are the normal forms, which are related to the notion of normal form in term rewriting.

== Structures and connectives ==
The term structure in structural proof theory comes from a technical notion introduced in the sequent calculus: the sequent calculus represents the assertion made at any stage of an inference using special, extra-logical operators called structural operators: in $A_1, \dots, A_m \vdash B_1, \dots, B_n$, the commas to the left of the turnstile are operators normally interpreted as conjunctions, those to the right as disjunctions, whilst the turnstile symbol itself is interpreted as an implication. However, there is a fundamental difference in behaviour between these operators and the logical connectives they are interpreted by in the sequent calculus: the structural operators are used in every rule of the calculus, and are not considered when asking whether the subformula property applies. Furthermore, the logical rules go one way only: logical structure is introduced by logical rules, and cannot be eliminated once created, while structural operators can be introduced and eliminated in the course of a derivation.

The idea of looking at the syntactic features of sequents as special, non-logical operators is not old, and was forced by innovations in proof theory: when the structural operators are as simple as in Getzen's original sequent calculus there is little need to analyse them, but proof calculi of deep inference such as display logic (introduced by Nuel Belnap in 1982) support structural operators as complex as the logical connectives, and demand sophisticated treatment.

== Cut-elimination in the sequent calculus ==
The cut-elimination theorem (Hauptsatz) is a key result for the sequent calculus. The theorem states that any sequent derivable using the cut rule can be derived without it. The cut rule, which generalizes the logical principle of modus ponens, is formulated as

$\frac{\Gamma \vdash \Delta, A \quad A, \Pi \vdash \Sigma}{\Gamma, \Pi \vdash \Delta, \Sigma} \quad (\text{Cut}),$

where, $\Gamma, \Delta, \Pi,$ and $\Sigma$ are sequences of formulas. The cut formula $A$ is effectively used as an intermediate lemma that is introduced and then eliminated. The significance of eliminating this rule is that resulting cut-free proofs possess the subformula property, which guarantees that every formula appearing anywhere in a cut-free derivation is a subformula of a formula in the final, concluding sequent. Therefore, the proof is entirely analytic as it does not require the introduction of any external concepts, aside from those already present in the statement being proven. This cut property is used for demonstrating the consistency of classical and intuitionistic logic and is used in proof-theoretic semantics.

== Natural deduction and the formulae-as-types correspondence ==
Natural deduction is a formal system for deriving logical conclusions from premises based on a set of inference rules that closely mirror intuitive human reasoning. The direct connection between logic and computation is through the Curry–Howard correspondence, which establishes a direct isomorphism between formulas in intuitionistic logic and types in typed lambda calculus. In this correspondence, every proposition can be viewed as a type, and a proof of that proposition is analogous to a program of that corresponding type. In essence, a proof is a construction that demonstrates the inhabitation of a type. For instance, a proof of an implication $A \to B$ corresponds to a function that takes a term of type $A$ as input and produces a term of type $B$ as output. Similarly, a proof of a conjunction $A \land B$ (a product type) corresponds to a pair containing a term of type $A$ and a term of type $B$. This relationship is not merely superficial. The process of proof normalization, where redundant logical steps are eliminated to simplify a proof, corresponds directly to the process of program execution, i.e., beta-reduction, in typed lambda calculus. This isomorphism links the computational content of logical proofs, modern type theory, and guides the design of proof assistants. The following diagram illustrates this correspondence.

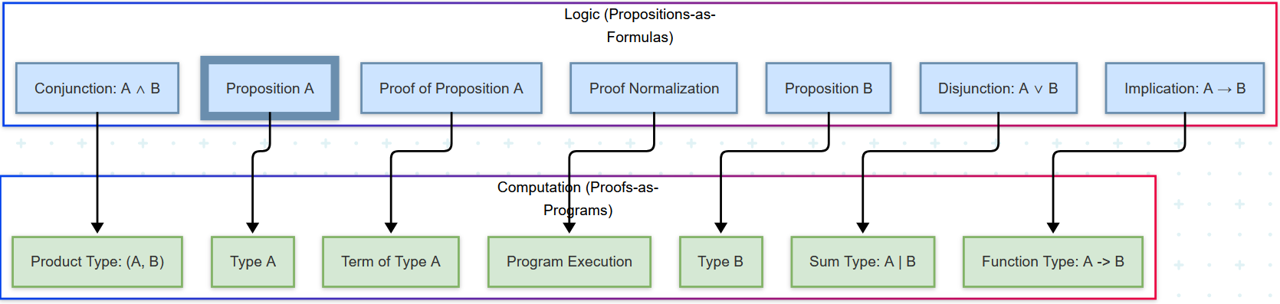
An example of a structural proof correspondence diagram

== Logical duality and harmony ==
Logical duality and harmony are linked through the symmetries of the sequent calculus. The architecture of a sequent, $\Gamma \vdash \Delta$, where $\Gamma, \Delta$ are finite multisets of formulas, establishes a fundamental duality between antecedents (left) and succedents (right). This duality is explicitly realized by the left and right introduction rules for each logical connective. For example, the rules for conjunction ($\land$) and disjunction ($\lor$) are dual:

$\begin{array}{ccc} \text{(}{\land}\text{L)} & \dfrac{A, B, \Gamma \vdash \Delta}{A \land B, \Gamma \vdash \Delta} & \text{(}{\land}\text{R)} & \dfrac{\Gamma \vdash \Delta, A \qquad \Gamma \vdash \Delta, B}{\Gamma \vdash \Delta, A \land B} \\ \\ \text{(}{\lor}\text{L)} & \dfrac{A, \Gamma \vdash \Delta \qquad B, \Gamma \vdash \Delta}{A \lor B, \Gamma \vdash \Delta} & \text{(}{\lor}\text{R)} & \dfrac{\Gamma \vdash \Delta, A, B}{\Gamma \vdash \Delta, A \lor B} \end{array}$

This left-right symmetry reflects a deeper harmony between the syntactic meaning of a connective, defined solely by its introduction rules, via the principle of inversion, and its eliminative behavior. The cut-elimination theorem guarantees this meta-theoretic harmony. The cut rule, $\text{(Cut)} \quad \dfrac{\Gamma \vdash \Delta, A \qquad A, \Sigma \vdash \Lambda}{\Gamma, \Sigma \vdash \Delta, \Lambda},$ represents a form of semantic gluing; its admissibility demonstrates that the proof system is internally consistent and analytic, i.e., proofs need not reference extraneous concepts, e.g., formula $A$, that are not present in the conclusion. The successful reduction of a cut on a complex formula to cuts on its subformulas, via key-case reductions between left and right rules, e.g., reducing a cut on $A \land B$ introduced by both ($\land$R) and ($\land$L), is the computational manifestation of the perfect balance between a connective's introduction and elimination potential. Thus, cut-elimination validates that the operational rules are in harmony, ensuring the logical system is both consistent and that its proofs possess good normalization properties.

== Locality ==
Certain inference rules are local, which is a desired property. For example, consider the !-rule in linear logic:
$$\frac{\vdash A, ?B_1, \dots, ?B_n}{\vdash !A, ?B_1, \dots, ?B_n}$$
In order to check that the !-rule has been applied correctly to a certain sequent calculus step $\frac{\vdash A, B_1, \dots, B_n}{\vdash A', B_1, \dots, B_n}$, it's not only necessary to check that $A' = ?A$, but also necessary to check that each of $B_i$ has ! as its outermost logical connective. In this sense, the rule is not local, since in order to apply the rule, one must check an unbounded number of formulas.

As a more familiar example, in the classical sequent calculus LK, the inference rules for OR are
$$\frac{A, \Gamma \vdash \Delta \quad B, \Gamma \vdash \Delta}{A \or B, \Gamma \vdash \Delta}(\or\vdash), \quad
\frac{\Gamma \vdash A, \Delta}{\Gamma \vdash A \or B, \Delta}(\vdash\or_1), \quad \frac{\Gamma \vdash B, \Delta}{\Gamma \vdash A \or B, \Delta}(\vdash\or_2)$$
The rule $\or\vdash$ is not local, since in order to check that it has been correctly applied in a step
$$\frac{A, \Gamma \vdash \Delta \quad B, \Gamma' \vdash \Delta'}{C, \Gamma \vdash \Delta}$$
one must check not only that $C = A \or B$, but also that $\Gamma = \Gamma', \Delta = \Delta'$. The rules $\vdash \or_1, \vdash \or_2$ are local.

Locality was originally motivated by considerations of parallel logic programming. The idea is as follows: A large sequent $\Gamma \vdash \Delta$ might be stored in a distributed way, across several processors and several memory locations. A local inference step can be performed with a bounded amount of interaction, while nonlocal inference steps may be performed with arbitrarily large amount of interaction. For example, specifically, in order to perform $\frac{\Gamma \vdash B, \Delta}{\Gamma \vdash A \or B, \Delta}$, a processor need to produce a new sequent $\Gamma' \vdash \Delta'$, such that $\Gamma'$ simply points to the same memory address as $\Gamma$, and $\Delta'$ points to $A \or B$, followed by the second memory address of $B , \Delta$. In contrast, applying a rule $\or\vdash$ requires checking that two sequents are identical, which takes $O(n)$ operations, where $n$ is the number of formulas in the sequent.

== Hypersequents ==
The hypersequent framework extends the ordinary sequent structure to a multiset of sequents, using an additional structural connective | (called the hypersequent bar) to separate different sequents. It has been used to provide analytic calculi for, e.g., modal, intermediate and substructural logics A hypersequent is a structure

$\Gamma_1 \vdash \Delta_1 \mid \dots \mid \Gamma_n \vdash \Delta_n$

where each $\Gamma_i \vdash\Delta_i$ is an ordinary sequent, called a component of the hypersequent. As for sequents, hypersequents can be based on sets, multisets, or sequences, and the components can be single-conclusion or multi-conclusion sequents. The formula interpretation of the hypersequents depends on the logic under consideration, but is nearly always some form of disjunction. The most common interpretations are as a simple disjunction

$(\bigwedge\Gamma_1 \rightarrow \bigvee \Delta_1) \lor \dots \lor (\bigwedge\Gamma_n \rightarrow \bigvee \Delta_n)$

for intermediate logics, or as a disjunction of boxes

$\Box(\bigwedge\Gamma_1 \rightarrow\bigvee \Delta_1) \lor \dots \lor \Box(\bigwedge\Gamma_n \rightarrow \bigvee\Delta_n)$

for modal logics.

In line with the disjunctive interpretation of the hypersequent bar, essentially all hypersequent calculi include the external structural rules, in particular the external weakening rule

$\frac{\Gamma_1 \vdash \Delta_1 \mid \dots \mid \Gamma_n \vdash \Delta_n}{\Gamma_1 \vdash \Delta_1 \mid \dots \mid \Gamma_n \vdash \Delta_n \mid \Sigma \vdash \Pi}$

and the external contraction rule

$\frac{\Gamma_1\vdash \Delta_1 \mid \dots \mid\Gamma_n \vdash \Delta_n \mid \Gamma_n \vdash \Delta_n}{\Gamma_1\vdash \Delta_1 \mid \dots \mid\Gamma_n \vdash \Delta_n}$

The additional expressivity of the hypersequent framework is provided by rules manipulating the hypersequent structure. An important example is provided by the modalised splitting rule

$\frac{\Gamma_1 \vdash \Delta_1 \mid \dots \mid \Gamma_n \vdash \Delta_n \mid \Box \Sigma, \Omega \vdash \Box \Pi, \Theta}{\Gamma_1 \vdash \Delta_1 \mid \dots \mid \Gamma_n \vdash \Delta_n \mid \Box \Sigma \vdash \Box \Pi \mid \Omega \vdash \Theta}$

for modal logic S5, where $\Box \Sigma$ means that every formula in $\Box\Sigma$ is of the form $\Box A$.

Another example is given by the communication rule for the intermediate logic LC

$\frac{\Gamma_1 \vdash \Delta_1 \mid \dots \mid \Gamma_n \vdash \Delta_n \mid \Omega \vdash A \qquad \Sigma_1 \vdash \Pi_1 \mid \dots \mid \Sigma_m \vdash \Pi_m \mid \Theta \vdash B }{\Gamma_1\vdash \Delta_1 \mid \dots \mid \Gamma_n \vdash \Delta_n \mid \Sigma_1 \vdash \Pi_1 \mid \dots \mid \Sigma_m \vdash \Pi_m \mid \Omega \vdash B \mid \Theta \vdash A}$

Note that in the communication rule the components are single-conclusion sequents.

== Nested sequent calculus ==
The nested sequent calculus is a formalisation that resembles a 2-sided calculus of structures.
