= Daniel Kolak =

Croatian-American philosopher (born 1955)

Daniel Kolak (born 1955 in Zagreb, SR Croatia) is a Croatian-American philosopher who works primarily in philosophy of mind, personal identity, cognitive science, philosophy of science, philosophy of mathematics, philosophy of logic, philosophy of religion, and aesthetics. He is professor of philosophy at the William Paterson University in New Jersey and an Affiliate of the Rutgers University Center for Cognitive Science (RuCCS). Kolak is the founder of the philosophical therapy known as "cognitive dynamics".

== Biography ==
Kolak is a prolific philosopher, who has written more than thirty-five books and edited nearly two hundred. He is professor of philosophy at the William Paterson University of New Jersey (WPUNJ), where he chaired the Philosophy Department and founded and directed the WPUNJ cognitive science laboratory. He also directs research at the Brain Behavior Center and is an affiliate of Rutgers University's Center for Cognitive Science (RuCCS). Kolak's numerous articles, stories, essays, books, and other creative works bridge traditional philosophy with other areas of inquiry and expression, from neuroscience to quantum mechanics, from logic and mathematics to art, music, and literature. Among his best known works are I Am You: The Metaphysical Foundations for Global Ethics, Principles of Cognitive Science, a translation of Wittgenstein's Tractatus, Wisdom Without Answers, From the Presocratics to the Present, In Search of God: The Language and Logic of Belief, The Experience of Philosophy, Self, Cosmos, God, Self and Identity, and the novel In Search of Myself: Life, Death and Personal Identity. He is editor and chief programmer and designer of the interactive electronic library The Philosophy Source on CD-ROM, and was Series Editor of the Wadsworth Philosopher Series and Philosophical Topics. As Series Editor at Longman, he is currently bringing out new editions of the complete canon of philosophy from ancient times to the present. Translated into over a dozen languages, collectively his books have sold over a million copies worldwide.

Kolak is the popularizer of the philosophy known as open individualism, which he developed along with his view of metaphysical subjectivism and the nonlocality of consciousness, according to which there exists but one numerically identical individual subject who is everyone. In his groundbreaking I Am You: the Metaphysical Foundations for Global Ethics, he writes: "The central thesis of I Am You - that we are all the same person - is apt to strike many readers as obviously false or even absurd. How could you be me and Hitler and Gandhi and Jesus and Buddha and Greta Garbo and everybody else in the past, present and future? In this book I explain how this is possible. Moreover, I show that this is the best explanation of who we are for a variety of reasons, not the least of which is that it provides the metaphysical foundations for global ethics." Variations on Kolak's theme have been voiced periodically throughout the ages (the Upanishads, Averroes, Giordano Bruno, Schopenhauer, Josiah Royce); more recently, physicists such as Erwin Schrödinger, Fred Hoyle, and Freeman Dyson have espoused it.

Kolak continues to work on the logical foundations of quantum mechanics and a mathematical model of consciousness (e.g. Stone–Čech compactification) that integrates relativity and quantum mechanics using an "Ultra-Strong (Open World) Nonlocality" variation on a (spinning, with closed timelike paths) Gödel universe, and other such foundational issues in mathematics, physics and logic further refined with Jaakko Hintikka's IF (independence-friendly) and epistemic logics. He has also made original contributions to the philosophy of religion, the history of philosophy, and the teaching of philosophy.

Kolak is the founder of the philosophical therapy known as cognitive dynamics, which has been used to create new paradigms and technologies for expanding human consciousness, increasing intelligence, and improving creativity. It is still under development. More information about this aspect of Kolak's research in cognitive science (cognitive neuroscience; self-representation; information processing; knowledge representation; mental models; the logic and mathematics of mental processes; autism, confabulation, self-deception, MPD; dreaming), philosophy of mind (personal identity, consciousness, and self; philosophical psychology; psychoanalytic theory) can be found at the Rutgers University Center for Cognitive Science (RuCCS).

Kolak is an expert on dreams, particularly about how the brain synthesizes experience and creates the virtual world we call reality. His unique work on lucid dreams has recently been featured in a documentary, produced by NBC/Universal, which aired in November 2006.

As a composer and musician he has performed in concert on numerous occasions, both solo and with leading musicians such as Charlie Byrd, Dizzy Gillespie and Frank Zappa. As a theatrical director and composer he has won the coveted Helen Hayes Creativity Award for productions such as Sartre's No Exit at the Source Theater in Washington, D.C. Among his film work is the teleplay Id-Entity, about multiple personality disorder as seen through the eyes of four patients, for which Kolak wrote, directed, and produced, and the score and soundtrack. Forsaken Cries: the Case of Rwanda which he produced for PBS, by Amnesty International and narrated by Danny Glover. Most recently Kolak served as special advisor to Martin Scorsese in the making of the Academy Award-winning film The Departed.

In the United States, Kolak successfully lobbied the U.S. government on behalf of the children and retirees of the United Nations and its sister institutions the IMF and World Bank. As president and co-founder of the G-4 Coalition in Washington, D.C., Kolak helped write a bill, sponsored by US Senator Ted Kennedy, allowing the children and retirees of the IMF and World Bank to become permanent U.S. residents. He testified before Congress and worked together with former World Bank President Robert S. McNamara to lobby successfully for the bill's passage. For his efforts on behalf of the international community living in the United States, he received a personal commendation from the Secretary General of the United Nations.

== Selected books ==
- I Am You: The Metaphysical Foundations for Global Ethics, Dordrecht, the Netherlands: Synthese Library, Springer, 2004 ISBN 1-4020-2999-3
- In Search of Myself: Life, Death and Personal Identity, Wadsworth, 1999 ISBN 0-534-23928-5
- Wittgenstein's Tractatus, McGraw-Hill, 1998, ISBN 1-55934-993-X. This is a translation, with a preface, introduction, and endnotes by Kolak.
- On Jaakko Hintikka, Wadsworth, 2001, ISBN 0-534-58389-X
- Cognitive Science, Routledge, 2006, ISBN 978-0-415-22101-6
- From the Presocratics to the Present: A Personal Odyssey, McGraw-Hill, 1998, ISBN 1-55934-975-1
- Quantifiers, Questions and Quantum Physics, (with John Symons) Springer, 2004, ISBN 1-4020-3210-2
- Self and Identity, Macmillan, 1991, ISBN 0-02-365710-3
- In Search of God: The Language and Logic of Belief, Wadsworth, 1994, ISBN 0-534-19536-9

== See also ==
- Open individualism
- Tat Tvam Asi
