= Obligationes =

Obligationes or disputations de obligationibus were a medieval disputation format common in the 13th and 14th centuries. Despite the name, they had nothing to do with ethics or morals but rather dealt with logical formalisms; the name comes from the fact that the participants were "obliged" to follow the rules. Typically, there were two disputants, one Opponens and one Respondens. At the start of a debate, both the disputants would agree on a ‘positum’, usually a false statement. The task of Respondens was to answer rationally to the questions from the Opponens, assuming the truth of the positum and without contradicting himself. On the opposite, the task of the Opponens was to try to force the Respondens into contradictions.

Several styles of Obligationes were distinguished in the medieval literature with the most widely studied being called "positio" (positing). "Obligational" disputations resemble recent theories of counterfactual reasoning and are believed to precede the modern practice of the academic "thesis defense." Obligationes also resembles a stylized, highly formalized, version of Socratic dialogues. It can also be a form a Aristotelian dialectical situation with an Answerer and a Questioner. It precedes other more modern dialogical accounts of logic such as Lorenzen games, Hintikka games and game semantics.

William of Ockham said Obligationes:

...consists of this that in the beginning some proposition has to be posited, and then propositions have to be proposed as pleases the opponent, and to these the respondent has to answer by granting or denying or doubting or distinguishing. When these answers are given, the opponent, when it pleases him, has to say: “time is finished”. This is, the time of the obligation is finished. And then it is seen whether the respondent has answered well or not.

== Bibliography ==
- Ashworth, E. J. "Obligationes Treatises: A Catalogue of Manuscripts, Editions and Studies." Bulletin de Philosophie Médiévale 36, 1994, pp. 118-147.
- Dutilh Novaes, Catarina (2007). Formalizing Medieval Logical Theories: Suppositio, Consequentiae and Obligationes. Springer Science & Business Media. ISBN 9781402058530.
- Dutilh Novaes, C. and S.L. Uckelman (2016). “Obligationes,” in C. Dutilh Novaes and S. Read (eds), Cambridge Companion to Medieval Logic (2016). Cambridge University Press. ISBN 9781107449862 pp. 370–95.
- Ekenberg, Thomas. "Order in Obligational Disputations." In: Georgiana Donavin, Carol Poster, Richard Utz (eds.), Medieval Forms of Argument: Disputation and Debate. Eugene, OR: Wipf & Stock, 2002. pp. 53-66.
