= Hintikka set =

In mathematical logic, a Hintikka set is a set of logical formulas whose elements satisfy the following properties:

1. An atom or its conjugate can appear in the set but not both,
2. If a formula in the set has a main operator that is of "conjunctive-type", then its two operands appear in the set,
3. If a formula in the set has a main operator that is of "disjunctive-type", then at least one of its two operands appears in the set.

The exact meaning of "conjunctive-type" and "disjunctive-type" is defined by the method of semantic tableaux.

Hintikka sets arise when attempting to prove completeness of propositional logic using semantic tableaux. They are named after Jaakko Hintikka.

== Propositional Hintikka sets ==
In a semantic tableau for propositional logic, Hintikka sets can be defined using uniform notation for propositional tableaux. The elements of a propositional Hintikka set S satisfy the following conditions:

1. No variable and its conjugate are both in S,
2. For any $\alpha$ in S, its components $\alpha_1, \alpha_2$ are both in S,
3. For any $\beta$ in S, at least one of its components $\beta_1,\beta_2$ are in S.

If a set S is a Hintikka set, then S is satisfiable.

== Sources ==
- Smullyan, R. M. (1971). First-Order Logic (Second printing ed.). Springer Science & Business Media. pp. 21, 26–27. ISBN 978-3-642-86720-0. LCCN 68-13495.
