= Game semantics =

Approach to formal semantics

Game semantics is an approach to formal semantics that grounds the concepts of truth or validity on game-theoretic concepts, such as the existence of a winning strategy for a player. In this framework, logical formulas are interpreted as defining games between two players. The term encompasses several related but distinct traditions, including dialogical logic (developed by Paul Lorenzen and Kuno Lorenz in Germany starting in the 1950s) and game-theoretical semantics (developed by Jaakko Hintikka in Finland).

Game semantics represents a significant departure from traditional model-theoretic approaches by emphasizing the dynamic, interactive nature of logical reasoning rather than static truth assignments. It provides intuitive interpretations for various logical systems, including classical logic, intuitionistic logic, linear logic, and modal logic. The approach bears conceptual resemblances to ancient Socratic dialogues, medieval theory of Obligationes, and constructive mathematics. Since the 1990s, game semantics has found important applications in theoretical computer science, particularly in the semantics of programming languages, concurrency theory, and the study of computational complexity.

== History ==
In the late 1950s Paul Lorenzen was the first to introduce a game semantics for logic, and it was further developed by Kuno Lorenz. At almost the same time as Lorenzen, Jaakko Hintikka developed a model-theoretical approach known in the literature as GTS (game-theoretical semantics). Since then, a number of different game semantics have been studied in logic.

Shahid Rahman (Lille III) and collaborators developed dialogical logic into a general framework for the study of logical and philosophical issues related to logical pluralism. Beginning 1994 this triggered a kind of renaissance with lasting consequences. This new philosophical impulse experienced a parallel renewal in the fields of theoretical computer science, computational linguistics, artificial intelligence, and the formal semantics of programming languages, for instance the work of Johan van Benthem and collaborators in Amsterdam who looked thoroughly at the interface between logic and games, and Hanno Nickau who addressed the full abstraction problem in programming languages by means of games. New results in linear logic by Jean-Yves Girard in the interfaces between mathematical game theory and logic on one hand and argumentation theory and logic on the other hand resulted in the work of many others, including S. Abramsky, J. van Benthem, A. Blass, D. Gabbay, M. Hyland, W. Hodges, R. Jagadeesan, G. Japaridze, E. Krabbe, L. Ong, H. Prakken, G. Sandu, D. Walton, and J. Woods, who placed game semantics at the center of a new concept in logic in which logic is understood as a dynamic instrument of inference. There has also been an alternative perspective on proof theory and meaning theory, advocating that Wittgenstein's "meaning as use" paradigm as understood in the context of proof theory, where the so-called reduction rules (showing the effect of elimination rules on the result of introduction rules) should be seen as appropriate to formalise the explanation of the (immediate) consequences one can draw from a proposition, thus showing the function/purpose/usefulness of its main connective in the calculus of language (de Queiroz (1988), de Queiroz (1991), de Queiroz (1994), de Queiroz (2001), de Queiroz (2008), de Queiroz (2023), de Queiroz (2025a), de Queiroz (2025b)).

== Classical logic ==
The simplest application of game semantics is to propositional logic. Each formula of this language is interpreted as a game between two players, known as the "Verifier" and the "Falsifier". The Verifier is given "ownership" of all the disjunctions in the formula, and the Falsifier is likewise given ownership of all the conjunctions. Each move of the game consists of allowing the owner of the principal connective to pick one of its branches; play will then continue in that subformula, with whichever player controls its principal connective making the next move. Play ends when a primitive proposition has been so chosen by the two players; at this point the Verifier is deemed the winner if the resulting proposition is true, and the Falsifier is deemed the winner if it is false. The original formula will be considered true precisely when the Verifier has a winning strategy, while it will be false whenever the Falsifier has the winning strategy.

If the formula contains negations or implications, other, more complicated, techniques may be used. For example, a negation should be true if the thing negated is false, so it must have the effect of interchanging the roles of the two players.

More generally, game semantics may be applied to predicate logic; the new rules allow a principal quantifier to be removed by its "owner" (the Verifier for existential quantifiers and the Falsifier for universal quantifiers) and its bound variable replaced at all occurrences by an object of the owner's choosing, drawn from the domain of quantification. Note that a single counterexample falsifies a universally quantified statement, and a single example suffices to verify an existentially quantified one. Assuming the axiom of choice, the game-theoretical semantics for classical first-order logic agree with the usual model-based (Tarskian) semantics. For classical first-order logic the winning strategy for the Verifier essentially consists of finding adequate Skolem functions and witnesses. For example, if S denotes $\forall x \exists y\, \phi(x,y)$ then an equisatisfiable statement for S is $\exists f \forall x \, \phi(x,f(x))$. The Skolem function f (if it exists) actually codifies a winning strategy for the Verifier of S by returning a witness for the existential sub-formula for every choice of x the Falsifier might make.

The above definition was first formulated by Jaakko Hintikka as part of his GTS interpretation. The original version of game semantics for classical (and intuitionistic) logic due to Paul Lorenzen and Kuno Lorenz was not defined in terms of models but of winning strategies over formal dialogues (P. Lorenzen, K. Lorenz 1978, S. Rahman and L. Keiff 2005). Shahid Rahman and Tero Tulenheimo developed an algorithm to convert GTS-winning strategies for classical logic into the dialogical winning strategies and vice versa.

Formal dialogues and GTS games may be infinite and use end-of-play rules rather than letting players decide when to stop playing. Reaching this decision by standard means for strategic inferences (iterated elimination of dominated strategies or IEDS) would, in GTS and formal dialogues, be equivalent to solving the halting problem and exceeds the reasoning abilities of human agents. GTS avoids this with a rule to test formulas against an underlying model; logical dialogues, with a non-repetition rule (similar to threefold repetition in Chess). Genot and Jacot (2017) proved that players with severely bounded rationality can reason to terminate a play without IEDS.

For most common logics, including the ones above, the games that arise from them have perfect information—that is, the two players always know the truth values of each primitive, and are aware of all preceding moves in the game. However, with the advent of game semantics, logics, such as the independence-friendly logic of Hintikka and Sandu, with a natural semantics in terms of games of imperfect information have been proposed.

== Intuitionistic logic, denotational semantics, linear logic, logical pluralism ==
The primary motivation for Lorenzen and Kuno Lorenz was to find a game-theoretic (their term was dialogical, in German Dialogische Logik) semantics for intuitionistic logic. Andreas Blass was the first to point out connections between game semantics and linear logic. This line was further developed by Samson Abramsky, Radhakrishnan Jagadeesan, Pasquale Malacaria and independently Martin Hyland and Luke Ong, who placed special emphasis on compositionality, i.e. the definition of strategies inductively on the syntax. Using game semantics, the authors mentioned above have solved the long-standing problem of defining a fully abstract model for the programming language PCF. Consequently, game semantics has led to fully abstract semantic models for a variety of programming languages, and to new semantic-directed methods of software verification by software model checking.

Shahid Rahman and Helge Rückert extended the dialogical approach to the study of several non-classical logics such as modal logic, relevance logic, free logic and connexive logic. Recently, Rahman and collaborators developed the dialogical approach into a general framework aimed at the discussion of logical pluralism.

== Quantifiers ==
Foundational considerations of game semantics have been more emphasised by Jaakko Hintikka and Gabriel Sandu, especially for independence-friendly logic (IF logic, more recently information-friendly logic), a logic with branching quantifiers. It was thought that the principle of compositionality fails for these logics, so that a Tarskian truth definition could not provide a suitable semantics. To get around this problem, the quantifiers were given a game-theoretic meaning. Specifically, the approach is the same as in classical propositional logic, except that the players do not always have perfect information about previous moves by the other player. Wilfrid Hodges has proposed a compositional semantics and proved it equivalent to game semantics for IF-logics.

More recently Shahid Rahman and the team of dialogical logic in Lille implemented dependences and independences within a dialogical framework by means of a dialogical approach to intuitionistic type theory called immanent reasoning.

== Computability logic ==
Japaridze’s computability logic is a game-semantical approach to logic in an extreme sense, treating games as targets to be serviced by logic rather than as technical or foundational means for studying or justifying logic. Its starting philosophical point is that logic is meant to be a universal, general-utility intellectual tool for ‘navigating the real world’ and, as such, it should be construed semantically rather than syntactically, because it is semantics that serves as a bridge between real world and otherwise meaningless formal systems (syntax). Syntax is thus secondary, interesting only as much as it services the underlying semantics. From this standpoint, Japaridze has repeatedly criticized the often followed practice of adjusting semantics to some already existing target syntactic constructions, with Lorenzen’s approach to intuitionistic logic being an example. This line of thought then proceeds to argue that the semantics, in turn, should be a game semantics, because games “offer the most comprehensive, coherent, natural, adequate and convenient mathematical models for the very essence of all ‘navigational’ activities of agents: their interactions with the surrounding world”. Accordingly, the logic-building paradigm adopted by computability logic is to identify the most natural and basic operations on games, treat those operators as logical operations, and then look for sound and complete axiomatizations of the sets of game-semantically valid formulas. On this path a host of familiar or unfamiliar logical operators have emerged in the open-ended language of computability logic, with several sorts of negations, conjunctions, disjunctions, implications, quantifiers and modalities.

Games are played between two agents: a machine and its environment, where the machine is required to follow only computable strategies. This way, games are seen as interactive computational problems, and the machine's winning strategies for them as solutions to those problems. It has been established that computability logic is robust with respect to reasonable variations in the complexity of allowed strategies, which can be brought down as low as logarithmic space and polynomial time (one does not imply the other in interactive computations) without affecting the logic. All this explains the name “computability logic” and determines applicability in various areas of computer science. Classical logic, independence-friendly logic and certain extensions of linear and intuitionistic logics turn out to be special fragments of computability logic, obtained merely by disallowing certain groups of operators or atoms.

== See also ==
- Computability logic
- Dependence logic
- Ehrenfeucht–Fraïssé game
- Independence-friendly logic
- Interactive computation
- Intuitionistic logic
- Ludics

== Bibliography ==
=== Books ===
- T. Aho and A-V. Pietarinen (eds.) Truth and Games. Essays in honour of Gabriel Sandu. Societas Philosophica Fennica (2006).ISBN 951-9264-57-4.
- J. van Benthem, G. Heinzmann, M. Rebuschi and H. Visser (eds.) The Age of Alternative Logics. Springer (2006).ISBN 978-1-4020-5011-4.
- R. Inhetveen: Logik. Eine dialog-orientierte Einführung., Leipzig 2003 ISBN 3-937219-02-1
- L. Keiff Le Pluralisme Dialogique. Thesis Université de Lille 3 (2007).
- K. Lorenz, P. Lorenzen: Dialogische Logik, Darmstadt 1978
- P. Lorenzen: Lehrbuch der konstruktiven Wissenschaftstheorie, Stuttgart 2000 ISBN 3-476-01784-2
- O. Majer, A.-V. Pietarinen and T. Tulenheimo (editors). Games: Unifying Logic, Language and Philosophy. Springer (2009).
- S. Rahman, Über Dialogue protologische Kategorien und andere Seltenheiten. Frankfurt 1993 ISBN 3-631-46583-1
- S. Rahman and H. Rückert (editors), New Perspectives in Dialogical Logic. Synthese 127 (2001) ISSN 0039-7857.
- S. Rahman and N. Clerbout: Linking Games and Constructive Type Theory: Dialogical Strategies, CTT-Demonstrations and the Axiom of Choice. Springer-Briefs (2015). https://www.springer.com/gp/book/9783319190624.
- S. Rahman, Z. McConaughey, A. Klev, N. Clerbout: Immanent Reasoning or Equality in Action. A Plaidoyer for the Play level. Springer (2018). https://www.springer.com/gp/book/9783319911489.
- J. Redmond & M. Fontaine, How to play dialogues. An introduction to Dialogical Logic. London, College Publications (Col. Dialogues and the Games of Logic. A Philosophical Perspective N° 1). (ISBN 978-1-84890-046-2)

=== Articles ===
- S. Abramsky and R. Jagadeesan, Games and full completeness for multiplicative linear logic. Journal of Symbolic Logic 59 (1994): 543-574.
- A. Blass, A game semantics for linear logic. Annals of Pure and Applied Logic 56 (1992): 151-166.
- J.M.E.Hyland and H.L.Ong On Full Abstraction for PCF: I, II, and III. Information and computation, 163(2), 285-408.
- E.J. Genot and J. Jacot, Logical Dialogues with Explicit Preference Profiles and Strategy Selection, Journal of Logic, Language and Information 26, 261–291 (2017). doi.org/10.1007/s10849-017-9252-4
- D.R. Ghica, Applications of Game Semantics: From Program Analysis to Hardware Synthesis. 2009 24th Annual IEEE Symposium on Logic In Computer Science: 17-26. ISBN 978-0-7695-3746-7.
- G. Japaridze, Introduction to computability logic. Annals of Pure and Applied Logic 123 (2003): 1-99.
- G. Japaridze, In the beginning was game semantics. In Ondrej Majer, Ahti-Veikko Pietarinen and Tero Tulenheimo (editors), Games: Unifying logic, Language and Philosophy. Springer (2009).
- Krabbe, E. C. W., 2001. "Dialogue Foundations: Dialogue Logic Restituted [title has been misprinted as "...Revisited"]," Supplement to the Proceedings of the Aristotelian Society 75: 33-49.
- H. Nickau (1994). "Hereditarily Sequential Functionals". In A. Nerode; Yu.V. Matiyasevich (eds.). Proc. Symp. Logical Foundations of Computer Science: Logic at St. Petersburg. Lecture Notes in Computer Science. Vol. 813. Springer-Verlag. pp. 253–264. doi:10.1007/3-540-58140-5_25.
- de Queiroz, R. (1988). "A Proof-Theoretic Account of Programming and the Role of Reduction Rules". Dialectica. 42 (4): 265–282. doi:10.1111/j.1746-8361.1988.tb00919.x.
- de Queiroz, R. (1991). "Meaning as Grammar plus Consequences". Dialectica. 45 (1): 83–86. doi:10.1111/j.1746-8361.1991.tb00979.x.
- de Queiroz, R. (1994). "Normalisation and Language Games". Dialectica. 48 (2): 83–123. doi:10.1111/j.1746-8361.1994.tb00107.x.
- de Queiroz, R. (2001). "Meaning, Function, Purpose, Usefulness, Consequences – Interconnected Concepts". Logic Journal of the IGPL. 9 (5): 693–734. doi:10.1093/jigpal/9.5.693.
- de Queiroz, R. (2008). "On Reduction Rules, Meaning-as-use, and Proof-theoretic Semantics". Studia Logica. 90 (2): 211–247. doi:10.1007/s11225-008-9150-5. S2CID 11321602.
- de Queiroz, R. (2023). "From Tractatus to Later Writings and Back – New Implications from the Nachlass". SATS Northern European Journal of Philosophy. arXiv:2304.11203. doi:10.1515/sats-2022-0016. S2CID 258439631.
- de Queiroz, R. (2025a). "From the Notebooks to the Investigations and beyond". SATS Northern European Journal of Philosophy. 26: 61–113. arXiv:2504.18949. doi:10.1515/sats-2024-0015.
- de Queiroz, R. (2025b). "Meaning as Use, Application, Employment, Purpose, Usefulness". SATS Northern European Journal of Philosophy. 26 (2): 151–184. arXiv:2506.07131. doi:10.1515/sats-2025-0002.
- S. Rahman and L. Keiff, On how to be a dialogician. In Daniel Vanderken (ed.), Logic Thought and Action, Springer (2005), 359-408. ISBN 1-4020-2616-1.
- S. Rahman and T. Tulenheimo, From Games to Dialogues and Back: Towards a General Frame for Validity. In Ondrej Majer, Ahti-Veikko Pietarinen and Tero Tulenheimo (editors), Games: Unifying logic, Language and Philosophy. Springer (2009).
- Johan van Benthem (2003). "Logic and Game Theory: Close Encounters of the Third Kind". In G. E. Mints; Reinhard Muskens (eds.). Games, logic, and constructive sets. CSLI Publications. ISBN 978-1-57586-449-5.
