= Branching quantifier =

In logic a branching quantifier, also called a Henkin quantifier, finite partially ordered quantifier or even nonlinear quantifier, is a partial ordering

$$\langle Qx_1\dots Qx_n\rangle$$

of quantifiers for Q ∈ {∀,∃}. It is a special case of generalized quantifier. In classical logic, quantifier prefixes are linearly ordered such that the value of a variable y_{m} bound by a quantifier Q_{m} depends on the value of the variables

y_{1}, ..., y_{m−1}

bound by quantifiers

Qy_{1}, ..., Qy_{m−1}

preceding Q_{m}. In a logic with (finite) partially ordered quantification this is not in general the case.

Branching quantification first appeared in a 1959 conference paper of Leon Henkin. Systems of partially ordered quantification are intermediate in strength between first-order logic and second-order logic. They are being used as a basis for Hintikka's and Gabriel Sandu's independence-friendly logic.

== Definition and properties ==
The simplest Henkin quantifier $Q_H$ is

$$(Q_Hx_1,x_2,y_1,y_2)\varphi(x_1,x_2,y_1,y_2)\equiv\begin{pmatrix}\forall x_1 \, \exists y_1\\ \forall x_2 \, \exists y_2\end{pmatrix}\varphi(x_1,x_2,y_1,y_2).$$

It (in fact every formula with a Henkin prefix, not just the simplest one) is equivalent to its second-order Skolemization, i.e.

$$\exists f \, \exists g \, \forall x_1 \forall x_2 \, \varphi (x_1, x_2, f(x_1), g(x_2)).$$

It is also powerful enough to define the quantifier $Q_{\geq\mathbb{N}}$ (i.e. "there are infinitely many") defined as

$$(Q_{\geq\mathbb{N}}x)\varphi (x)\equiv(\exists a)(Q_Hx_1,x_2,y_1,y_2)[\varphi(a)\land (x_1=x_2 \leftrightarrow y_1=y_2) \land (\varphi (x_1)\rightarrow (\varphi (y_1)\land y_1\neq a))].$$

Several things follow from this, including the nonaxiomatizability of first-order logic with $Q_H$ (first observed by Ehrenfeucht), and its equivalence to the $\Sigma_1^1$-fragment of second-order logic (existential second-order logic)—the latter result published independently in 1970 by Herbert Enderton and W. Walkoe.

The following quantifiers are also definable by $Q_H$.

- Rescher: "The number of φs is less than or equal to the number of ψs"

$$(Q_Lx)(\varphi x,\psi x)\equiv \operatorname{Card}(\{ x \colon\varphi x\} )\leq \operatorname{Card}(\{ x \colon\psi x\} ) \equiv (Q_Hx_1x_2y_1y_2)[(x_1=x_2 \leftrightarrow y_1=y_2) \land (\varphi x_1 \rightarrow \psi y_1)]$$

- Härtig: "The φs are equinumerous with the ψs"

$$(Q_Ix)(\varphi x,\psi x)\equiv (Q_Lx)(\varphi x,\psi x) \land (Q_Lx)(\psi x,\varphi x)$$

- Chang: "The number of φs is equinumerous with the domain of the model"

$$(Q_Cx)(\varphi x)\equiv (Q_Lx)(x=x,\varphi x)$$

The Henkin quantifier $Q_H$ can itself be expressed as a type (4) Lindström quantifier.

== Relation to natural languages ==
Hintikka in a 1973 paper advanced the hypothesis that some sentences in natural languages are best understood in terms of branching quantifiers, for example: "some relative of each villager and some relative of each townsman hate each other" is supposed to be interpreted, according to Hintikka, as:

$$\begin{pmatrix}\forall x_1 \, \exists y_1\\ \forall x_2 \, \exists y_2\end{pmatrix} [(V(x_1) \wedge T(x_2)) \rightarrow (R(x_1,y_1) \wedge R(x_2,y_2) \wedge H(y_1, y_2) \wedge H(y_2, y_1))].$$

which is known to have no first-order logic equivalent.

The idea of branching is not necessarily restricted to using the classical quantifiers as leaves. In a 1979 paper, Jon Barwise proposed variations of Hintikka sentences (as the above is sometimes called) in which the inner quantifiers are themselves generalized quantifiers, for example: "Most villagers and most townsmen hate each other." Observing that $\Sigma_1^1$ is not closed under negation, Barwise also proposed a practical test to determine whether natural language sentences really involve branching quantifiers, namely to test whether their natural-language negation involves universal quantification over a set variable (a $\Pi_1^1$ sentence).

Hintikka's proposal was met with skepticism by a number of logicians because some first-order sentences like the one below appear to capture well enough the natural language Hintikka sentence.

$$[\forall x_1 \, \exists y_1 \, \forall x_2 \, \exists y_2\, \varphi (x_1, x_2, y_1, y_2)] \wedge [\forall x_2 \, \exists y_2 \, \forall x_1 \, \exists y_1\, \varphi (x_1, x_2, y_1, y_2)]$$

where

$$\varphi (x_1, x_2, y_1, y_2)$$

denotes

$$(V(x_1) \wedge T(x_2)) \rightarrow (R(x_1,y_1) \wedge R(x_2,y_2) \wedge H(y_1, y_2) \wedge H(y_2, y_1))$$

Although much purely theoretical debate followed, it wasn't until 2009 that some empirical tests with students trained in logic found that they are more likely to assign models matching the "bidirectional" first-order sentence rather than branching-quantifier sentence to several natural-language constructs derived from the Hintikka sentence. For instance students were shown undirected bipartite graphs—with squares and circles as vertices—and asked to say whether sentences like "more than 3 circles and more than 3 squares are connected by lines" were correctly describing the diagrams.

== See also ==
- Game semantics
- Dependence logic
- Independence-friendly logic (IF logic)
- Mostowski quantifier
- Lindström quantifier
- Nonfirstorderizability
