= William Craig (philosopher) =

American philosopher (1918–2016)

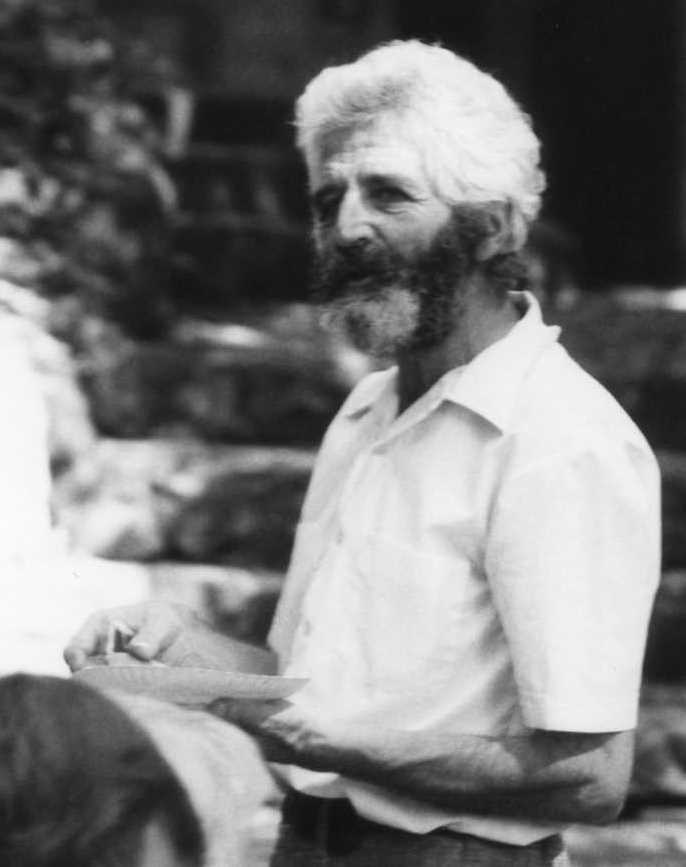
- William Craig, UC Berkeley Logic Group picnic 1977.
- Born: November 13, 1918; Nuremberg, German Empire
- Died: January 13, 2016 (aged 97); Berkeley, California, U.S.
- Occupations: Philosopher, academic

William Craig (November 13, 1918 – January 13, 2016) was an American academic, logician and philosopher, who taught at the University of California, Berkeley, in Berkeley, California. His research interests included mathematical logic, and the philosophy of science, and he is best known for the Craig interpolation theorem.

== Biography ==
William Craig was born in Nuremberg, Weimar Republic, on November 13, 1918. He graduated from Harvard University with a Ph.D. in 1951. He married Julia Rebecca Dwight Wilson and had four children: Ruth, Walter, Sarah, and Deborah. In 1959, he moved to UC Berkeley. He died on January 13, 2016, at the age of 97.

== Achievements ==
Craig is particularly remembered in two theorems that bear his name:

- the Craig interpolation theorem, and
- Craig's theorem, also known as Craig's axiomatization theorem or Craig's reaxiomatization theorem.

== See also ==
- American philosophy
- List of American philosophers
