= Independence-friendly logic =

Extension of classical first-order logic

Independence-friendly logic (IF logic; proposed by Jaakko Hintikka and Gabriel Sandu in 1989) is an extension of classical first-order logic (FOL) by means of slashed quantifiers of the form $(\exists v/V)$ and $(\forall v/V)$, where $V$ is a finite set of variables. The intended reading of $(\exists v/V)$ is "there is a $v$ which is functionally independent from the variables in $V$". IF logic allows one to express more general patterns of dependence between variables than those which are implicit in first-order logic. This greater level of generality leads to an actual increase in expressive power; the set of IF sentences can characterize the same classes of structures as existential second-order logic ($\Sigma^1_1$).

For example, it can express branching quantifier sentences, such as the formula $\exists c\forall x\exists y\forall z(\exists w/\{x,y\})((x=z \leftrightarrow y=w) \land y \neq c)$ which expresses infinity in the empty signature; this cannot be done in FOL. Therefore, first-order logic cannot, in general, express this pattern of dependency, in which $y$ depends only on $x$ and $c$, and $w$ depends only on $z$ and $c$. IF logic is more general than branching quantifiers, for example in that it can express dependencies that are not transitive, such as in the quantifier prefix $\forall x\exists y(\exists z/\{x\})$, which expresses that $y$ depends on $x$, and $z$ depends on $y$, but $z$ does not depend on $x$.

The introduction of IF logic was partly motivated by the attempt of extending the game semantics of first-order logic to games of imperfect information. Indeed, a semantics for IF sentences can be given in terms of these kinds of games (or, alternatively, by means of a translation procedure to existential second-order logic). A semantics for open formulas cannot be given in the form of a Tarskian semantics; an adequate semantics must specify what it means for a formula to be satisfied by a set of assignments of common variable domain (a team) rather than satisfaction by a single assignment. Such a team semantics was developed by Hodges.

Independence-friendly logic is translation equivalent, at the level of sentences, with a number of other logical systems based on team semantics, such as dependence logic, dependence-friendly logic, exclusion logic and independence logic; with the exception of the latter, IF logic is known to be equiexpressive to these logics also at the level of open formulas. However, IF logic differs from all the above-mentioned systems in that it lacks locality: the meaning of an open formula cannot be described just in terms of the free variables of the formula; it is instead dependent on the context in which the formula occurs.

Independence-friendly logic shares a number of metalogical properties with first-order logic, but there are some differences, including lack of closure under (classical, contradictory) negation and higher complexity for deciding the validity of formulas. Extended IF logic addresses the closure problem, but its game-theoretical semantics is more complicated, and such logic corresponds to a larger fragment of second-order logic, a proper subset of $\Delta_2^1$.

Hintikka argued that IF and extended IF logic should be used as a basis for the foundations of mathematics; this proposal was met in some cases with skepticism.

== Syntax ==
A number of slightly different presentations of independence-friendly logic have appeared in the literature; here we follow Mann et al (2011).

=== Terms and atomic formulas ===
For a fixed signature σ, terms and atomic formulas are defined exactly as in first-order logic with equality.

=== IF formulas ===
Formulas of IF logic are defined as follows:

1. Any atomic formula $\varphi$ is an IF formula.
2. If $\varphi$ is an IF formula, then $\lnot \varphi$ is an IF formula.
3. If $\varphi$ and $\psi$ are IF formulas, then $\phi \wedge \psi$ and $\phi \vee \psi$ are IF formulas.
4. If $\varphi$ is a formula, $v$ is a variable, and $V$ is a finite set of variables, then $(\exists v/V)\varphi$ and $(\forall v/V)\varphi$ are also IF formulas.

=== Free variables ===
The set $\mbox{Free}(\varphi)$ of the free variables of an IF formula $\varphi$ is defined inductively as follows:

1. If $\varphi$ is an atomic formula, then $\mbox{Free}(\varphi)$ is the set of all variables occurring in it.
2. $\mbox{Free}(\lnot\varphi) = \mbox{Free}(\varphi)$;
3. $\mbox{Free}(\varphi \vee \psi) = \mbox{Free}(\varphi) \cup \mbox{Free}(\psi)$;
4. $\mbox{Free}((\exists v/V)\varphi) = \mbox{Free}((\forall v/V)\varphi) = (\mbox{Free}(\varphi) \backslash \{v\})\cup V$.

The last clause is the only one that differs from the clauses for first-order logic, the difference being that also the variables in the slash set $V$ are counted as free variables.

=== IF Sentences ===
An IF formula $\varphi$ such that $\mbox{Free}(\phi) = \emptyset$ is an IF sentence.

== Semantics ==
Three main approaches have been proposed for the definition of the semantics of IF logic. The first two, based respectively on games of imperfect information and on Skolemization, are mainly used in the definition of IF sentences only. The former generalizes a similar approach, for first-order logic, which was based instead on games of perfect information. The third approach, team semantics, is a compositional semantics in the spirit of Tarskian semantics. However, this semantics does not define what it means for a formula to be satisfied by an assignment (rather, by a set of assignments). The first two approaches were developed in earlier publications on if logic; the third one by Hodges in 1997.

In this section, we differentiate the three approaches by writing distinct pedices, as in $\models_{GTS},\models_{Sk},\models$. Since the three approaches are fundamentally equivalent, only the symbol $\models$ will be used in the rest of the article.

=== Game-Theoretical Semantics ===
Game-Theoretical Semantics assigns truth values to IF sentences according to the properties of some 2-player games of imperfect information. For ease of presentation, it is convenient to associate games not only to sentences, but also to formulas. More precisely, one defines games $G(\varphi, \mathcal M, s)$ for each triple formed by an IF formula $\varphi$, a structure $\mathcal M$, and an assignment $s:U\supseteq \mbox{Free}(\varphi)\rightarrow \mathcal M$.

==== Players ====
The semantic game $G(\varphi, \mathcal M, s)$ has two players, called Eloise (or Verifier) and Abelard (or Falsifier).

==== Game rules ====
The allowed moves in the semantic game $G(\varphi,\mathcal M,s)$ are determined by the synctactical structure of the formula under consideration. For simplicity, we first assume that $\varphi$ is in negation normal form, with negations symbols occurring only in front of atomic subformulas.

1. If $\varphi$ is a literal, the game ends, and, if $\varphi$ is true in $\mathcal M$ (in the first-order sense), then Eloise wins; otherwise, Abelard wins.
2. If $\varphi=\psi_1\land\psi_2$, then Abelard chooses one of the subformulas $\psi_i$, and the corresponding game $G(\psi_i,\mathcal M,s)$ is played.
3. If $\varphi=\psi_1\lor\psi_2$, then Eloises chooses one of the subformulas $\psi_i$, and the corresponding game $G(\psi_i,\mathcal M,s)$ is played.
4. If $\varphi=(\forall v/V)\psi$, then Abelard chooses an element $a$ of $\mathcal M$, and game $G(\psi,\mathcal M,s(a/v))$ is played.
5. If $\varphi=(\exists v/V)\psi$, then Eloise chooses an element $a$ of $\mathcal M$, and game $G(\psi,\mathcal M,s(a/v))$ is played.

More generally, if $\varphi$ is not in negation normal form, we can state, as a rule for negation, that, when a game $G(\lnot\varphi,\mathcal M,s)$ is reached, the players begin playing a dual game $G^*(\varphi,\mathcal M,s)$ in which the roles of Verifiers and Falsifier are switched.

==== Histories ====
Informally, a sequence of moves in a game $G(\varphi,\mathcal M,s)$ is a history. At the end of each history $h$, some subgame $G(\psi_h,\mathcal M,s_h)$ is played; we call $s_h$ the assignment associated to $h$, and $\psi_h$ the subformula occurrence associated to $h$. The player associated to $h$ is Eloise in case the most external logical operator in $\psi_h$ is $\lor$ or $\exists$, and Abelard in case it is $\land$ or $\forall$.

The set $h$ of allowed moves in a history $h$ is $\mathcal M$ if the most external operator of $\psi_h$ is $\exists$ or $\forall$; it is $\{L,R\}$ ($L,R$ being any two distinct objects, symbolizing 'left' and 'right') in case the most external operator of $\psi_h$ is $\lor$ or $\land$.

Given two assignments $s,t$ of same domain, and $V\subseteq dom(s)$ we write $s\sim_V t$ if $s(w) = t(w)$ on any variable $w\in dom(s)\setminus V$.

Imperfect information is introduced in the games by stipulating that certain histories are indistinguishable for the associated player; indistinguishable histories are said to form an 'information set'. Intuitively, if the history $h$ is in the information set $I$, the player associated to $h$ does not know whether he is in $h$ or in some other history of $I$. Consider two histories $h,h'$ such that the associated $\psi_h,\psi_{h'}$ are identical subformula occurrences of the form $(Qv/V)\chi$ ($Q = \exists$ or $\forall$); if furthermore $s_h\sim_V s_{h'}$, we write $h\sim_\exists h'$ (in case $Q = \exists$) or $h\sim_\forall h'$ (in case $Q = \forall$), in order to specify that the two histories are indistinguishable for Eloise, resp. for Abelard. We also stipulate, in general, reflexivity of this relation: if $\psi =\chi_1\lor\chi_2$, then $h\sim_\exists h'$; and if $\psi =\chi_1\land\chi_2$, then $h\sim_\forall h'$.

==== Strategies ====
For a fixed game $G(\varphi,\mathcal M,s)$, write $H_\exists$ for the set of histories to which Eloise is associated, and similarly $H_\forall$ for the set of histories of Abelard.

A strategy for Eloise in the game $G(\varphi,\mathcal M,s)$ is any function that assigns, to any possible history in which it is Eloise's turn to play, a legal move; more precisely, any function $\sigma: H_\exists \rightarrow \prod_{h\in H_\exists}A(h)$ such that $\sigma(h)\in A(h)$ for every history $h\in H_\exists$. One can define dually the strategies of Abelard.

A strategy for Eloise is uniform if, whenever $h\sim_\exists h'$, $\sigma(h) = \sigma(h')$; for Abelard, if $h\sim_\forall h'$ implies $\sigma(h) = \sigma(h')$.

A strategy $\sigma$ for Eloise is winning if Eloise wins in each terminal history that can be reached by playing according to $\sigma$. Similarly for Abelard.

==== Truth, falsity, indeterminacy ====
An IF sentence $\varphi$ is true in a structure $\mathcal M$ ($\mathcal M\models_{GTS}^+\varphi$) if Eloise has a uniform winning strategy in the game $G(\varphi, \mathcal M, \emptyset)$. It is false ($\mathcal M\models_{GTS}^-\varphi$) if Abelard has a winning strategy. It is undetermined if neither Eloise nor Abelard has a winning strategy.

==== Conservativity ====
The semantics of IF logic thus defined is a conservative extension of first-order semantics, in the following sense. If $\varphi$ is an IF sentence with empty slash sets, associate to it the first-order formula $\varphi'$ which is identical to it, except in that each IF quantifier $(Qv/\emptyset)$ is replaced by the corresponding first-order quantifier $Qv$. Then $\mathcal M\models_{GTS}^+\varphi$ iff $\mathcal M\models\varphi'$ in the Tarskian sense; and $\mathcal M\models_{GTS}^-\varphi$ iff $\mathcal M\not\models\varphi'$ in the Tarskian sense.

==== Open formulas ====
More general games can be used to assign a meaning to (possibly open) IF formulas; more exactly, it is possible to define what it means for an IF formula $\varphi$ to be satisfied, on a structure $\mathcal M$, by a team $X$ (a set of assignments of common variable domain $dom(X)$ and codomain $\mathcal M$). The associated games $G(\varphi,M,X)$ begin with the random choice of an assignment $s\in X$; after this initial move, the game $G(\varphi,M,s)$ is played. The existence of a winning strategy for Eloise defines positive satisfaction ($M,X\models_{GTS}^+\varphi$), and existence of a winning strategy for Abelard defines negative satisfaction ($M,X\models_{GTS}^-\varphi$). At this level of generality, Game-theoretical Semantics can be replaced by an algebraic approach, team semantics (defined below).

=== Skolem Semantics ===
A definition of truth for IF sentences can be given, alternatively, by means of a translation into existential second-order logic. The translation generalizes the Skolemization procedure of first-order logic. Falsity is defined by a dual procedure called Kreiselization.

==== Skolemization ====
Given an IF formula $\varphi$, we first define its skolemization relativized to a finite set $U\supseteq \mbox{Free}(\varphi)$ of variables. For every existential quantifier $(\exists v/V)$ occurring in $\varphi$, let $f_v$ be a new function symbol (a "Skolem function"). We write $Subst(\varphi,v,t)$ for the formula which is obtained substituting, in $\varphi$, all free occurrences of the variable $v$ with the term $t$. The Skolemization of $\varphi$ relative to $U$, denoted $\mbox{Sk}_U(\varphi)$, is defined by the following inductive clauses:

1. $\operatorname{Sk}_{U}(\varphi )= \varphi$ if $\varphi$ is a literal.
2. $\operatorname{Sk}_{U}(\psi \lor \chi)=\operatorname{Sk}_{U}(\psi )\lor \operatorname{Sk}_{U}(\chi)$.
3. $\operatorname{Sk}_{U}(\psi \land \chi)=\operatorname{Sk}_{U}(\psi )\land \operatorname{Sk}_{U}(\chi)$.
4. $\operatorname{Sk}_{U}((\forall v/V)\psi )=\forall v\operatorname{Sk}_{U\cup \{v\}}(\psi )$.
5. $\operatorname{Sk}_{U}((\exists v/V)\psi )=Subst(\operatorname{Sk}_{U\cup \{v\}}(\psi ),v,f_v(y_{1},...,y_{n}))$, where $y_{1},...,y_{n}$ is a list of the variables in $U\setminus V$.

If $\varphi$ is an IF sentence, its (unrelativized) Skolemization is defined as $\mbox{Sk}(\varphi) = \mbox{Sk}_\varnothing(\varphi)$.

==== Kreiselization ====
Given an IF formula $\varphi$, associate, to each universal quantifier $(\forall v/V)$ occurring in it, a new function symbol $g_v$ (a "Kreisel function"). Then, the Kreiselization $\mbox{Kr}_U(\varphi)$ of $\varphi$ relative to a finite set of variables $U\supseteq\mbox{Free}(\varphi)$, is defined by the following inductive clauses:

1. $\operatorname{Kr}_{U}(\varphi )= \lnot\varphi$ if $\varphi$ is a literal.
2. $\operatorname{Kr}_{U}(\psi \land \chi)=\operatorname{Kr}_{U}(\psi )\lor \operatorname{Kr}_{U}(\chi)$.
3. $\operatorname{Kr}_{U}(\psi \lor \chi)=\operatorname{Kr}_{U}(\psi )\land \operatorname{Kr}_{U}(\chi)$.
4. $\operatorname{Kr}_{U}((\forall v/V)\psi )=Subst(\operatorname{Kr}_{U\cup \{v\}}(\psi ),v,g_v(y_{1},...,y_{n}))$, where $y_{1},...,y_{n}$ is a list of the variables in $U\setminus V$.
5. $\operatorname{Kr}_{U}((\exists v/V)\psi )=\forall v\operatorname{Kr}_{U\cup \{v\}}(\psi )$

If $\varphi$ is an IF sentence, its (unrelativized) Kreiselization is defined as $\mbox{Kr}(\varphi) = \mbox{Kr}_\varnothing(\varphi)$.

==== Truth, falsity, indeterminacy ====
Given an IF sentence $\varphi$ with $n$ existential quantifiers, a structure $\mathcal M$, and a list $\vec f$ of $n$ functions of appropriate arities, we denote as $(\mathcal M,\vec f)$ the expansion of $\mathcal M$ which assigns the functions $\vec f$ as interpretations for the Skolem functions of $\varphi$.

An IF sentence is true on a structure $\mathcal M$, written $\mathcal M\models_{\mbox{Sk}}^+\varphi$, if there is a tuple $\vec f$ of functions such that $(\mathcal M,\vec f)\models \mbox{Sk}(\varphi)$. Similarly, $\mathcal M\models_{\mbox{Sk}}^-\varphi$ if there is a tuple $\vec f$ of functions such that $(\mathcal M,\vec f)\models \mbox{Kr}(\varphi)$; and $\mathcal M\models_{\mbox{Sk}}^0\varphi$ iff neither of the previous conditions holds.

For any IF sentence, Skolem Semantics returns the same values as Game-theoretical Semantics.

=== Team Semantics ===
By means of team semantics, it is possible to give a compositional account of the semantics of IF logic. Truth and falsity are grounded on the notion of 'satisfiability of a formula by a team'.

==== Teams ====
Let $\mathcal M$ be a structure and let $V = \{v_1, \ldots, v_n\}$ be a finite set of variables. Then a team over $\mathcal M$ with domain $V$ is a set of assignments over $\mathcal M$ with domain $V$, that is, a set of functions $s$ from $V$ to $\mathcal M$.

==== Duplicating and supplementing teams ====
Duplicating and supplementing are two operations on teams which are related to the semantics of universal and existential quantification.

1. Given a team $X$ over a structure $\mathcal M$ and a variable $v$, the duplicating team $X[\mathcal M/v]$ is the team $\{s(a/v)|s\in X, a\in \mathcal M\}$.
2. Given a team $X$ over a structure $\mathcal M$, a function $F:X\rightarrow \mathcal M$ and a variable $v$, the supplementing team $X[F/v]$ is the team $\{s(F(s)/v)|s\in X\}$.

It is customary to replace repeated applications of these two operation with more succinct notations, such as $X[\mathcal MF/uv]$ for $(X[\mathcal M/u])[F/v]$.

==== Uniform functions on teams ====
As above, given two assignments $s,t$ with same variable domain, we write $s\sim_V t$ if $s(w) = t(w)$ for every variable $w\in dom(s)\setminus V$.

Given a team $X$ on a structure $\mathcal M$ and a finite set $V$ of variables, we say that a function $F:X\rightarrow \mathcal M$ is $V$-uniform if $F(s)=F(t)$ whenever $s \sim_V t$.

==== Semantic clauses ====
Team semantics is three-valued, in the sense that a formula may happen to be positively satisfied by a team on a given structure, or negatively satisfied by it, or neither. The semantics clauses for positive and negative satisfaction are defined by simultaneous induction on the synctactical structure of IF formulas.

Positive satisfaction:

1. $\!\mathcal M, X \models^+ R t_1 \ldots t_n$ if and only if, for every assignment $s \in X$, $\!\mathcal M, s \models R t_1 \ldots t_n$ in the sense of first-order logic (that is, the tuple $\!(s(t_1) \ldots s(t_n))$ is in the interpretation $R^{\mathcal M}$ of $R$).
2. $\!\mathcal M,X \models^+ t_1 = t_2$ if and only if, for every assignment $s \in X$, $\!\mathcal M, s \models t_1 = t_2$ in the sense of first-order logic (that is, $s(t_1) = s(t_2)$).
3. $\!\mathcal M,X \models^+ \lnot \phi$ if and only if $\!\mathcal M,X \models^- \phi$.
4. $\!\mathcal M,X \models^+ \varphi \wedge \psi$ if and only if $\!\mathcal M,X \models^+ \varphi$ and $\!\mathcal M,X \models^+ \psi$.
5. $\!\mathcal M,X \models^+ \varphi \vee \psi$ if and only if there exist teams $\!Y$ and $\!Z$ such that $X = Y \cup Z$ and $\!\mathcal M,Y \models^+ \varphi$ and $\!\mathcal M,Z \models^+ \psi$.
6. $\!\mathcal M,X \models^+ (\forall v/V) \varphi$ if and only if $\!\mathcal M,X[M/v] \models^+ \varphi$.
7. $\!\mathcal M,X \models^+ (\exists v/V) \varphi$ if and only if there exists a $V$-uniform function $F: X \rightarrow M$ such that $\!\mathcal M,X[F/v] \models^+ \phi$.

Negative satisfaction:

1. $\!\mathcal M, X \models^- R t_1 \ldots t_n$ if and only if, for every assignment $s \in X$, the tuple $\!(s(t_1) \ldots s(t_n))$ is not in the interpretation $R^{\mathcal M}$ of $R$.
2. $\!\mathcal M,X \models^- t_1 = t_2$ if and only if, for every assignment $s \in X$, $s(t_1) \neq s(t_2)$.
3. $\!\mathcal M,X \models^- \lnot \phi$ if and only if $\!\mathcal M,X \models^+ \phi$.
4. $\!\mathcal M,X \models^- \varphi \wedge \psi$ if and only if there exist teams $\!Y$ and $\!Z$ such that $X = Y \cup Z$ and $\!\mathcal M,Y \models^- \varphi$ and $\!\mathcal M,Z \models^- \psi$.
5. $\!\mathcal M,X \models^- \varphi \vee \psi$ if and only if $\!\mathcal M,X \models^- \varphi$ and $\!\mathcal M,X \models^- \psi$.
6. $\!\mathcal M,X \models^- (\forall v/V) \varphi$ if and only if there exists a $V$-uniform function $F: X \rightarrow M$ such that $\!\mathcal M,X[F/v] \models^- \phi$.
7. $\!\mathcal M,X \models^- (\exists v/V) \varphi$ if and only if $\!\mathcal M,X[M/v] \models^- \varphi$.

==== Truth, falsity, indeterminacy ====
According to team semantics, an IF sentence $\varphi$ is said to be true ($\mathcal M\models^+ \varphi$) on a structure $\mathcal M$ if it is satisfied on $\mathcal M$ by the singleton team $\{\emptyset\}$, in symbols: $\mathcal M,\{\emptyset\}\models^+ \varphi$. Similarly, $\varphi$ is said to be false ($\mathcal M\models^- \varphi$) on $\mathcal M$ if $\mathcal M,\{\emptyset\}\models^-\varphi$; it is said to be undetermined ($\mathcal M\models^0 \varphi$) if $\mathcal M,\{\emptyset\}\not\models^+\varphi$ and $\mathcal M,\{\emptyset\}\not\models^-\varphi$.

==== Relationship with Game-Theoretical Semantics ====
For any team $X$ on a structure $\mathcal M$, and any IF formula $\varphi$, we have: $\mathcal M,X \models^+ \varphi$ iff $\mathcal M,X \models_{GTS}^+ \varphi$ and $\mathcal M,X \models^- \varphi$ iff $\mathcal M,X \models_{GTS}^- \varphi$.

From this it immediately follows that, for sentences $\varphi$, $\mathcal M\models^+ \varphi \Leftrightarrow \mathcal M\models_{GTS}^+ \varphi$, $\mathcal M\models^- \varphi \Leftrightarrow \mathcal M\models_{GTS}^- \varphi$ and $\mathcal M\models^0 \varphi \Leftrightarrow \mathcal M\models^0_{GTS} \varphi$.

== Notions of equivalence ==
Since IF logic is, in its usual acception, three-valued, multiple notions of formula equivalence are of interest.

=== Equivalence of formulas ===
Let $\varphi,\psi$ be two IF formulas.

$\varphi\models^+\psi$ ($\varphi$ truth entails $\psi$) if $\mathcal M,X\models^+\varphi \Rightarrow \mathcal M,X\models^+\psi$ for any structure $\mathcal M$ and any team $X$ such that $dom(X)\supseteq \mbox{Free}(\varphi)\cup \mbox{Free}(\psi)$.

$\varphi \equiv^+\psi$ ($\varphi$ is truth equivalent to $\psi$) if $\varphi\models^+\psi$ and $\psi\models^+\varphi$.

$\varphi\models^-\psi$ ($\varphi$ falsity entails $\psi$) if $\mathcal M,X\models^-\psi \Rightarrow \mathcal M,X\models^-\varphi$ for any structure $\mathcal M$ and any team $X$ such that $dom(X)\supseteq \mbox{Free}(\varphi)\cup \mbox{Free}(\psi)$.

$\varphi \equiv^-\psi$ ($\varphi$ is falsity equivalent to $\psi$) if $\varphi\models^-\psi$ and $\psi\models^-\varphi$.

$\varphi\models\psi$ ($\varphi$ strongly entails to $\psi$) if $\varphi\models^+\psi$ and $\varphi\models^-\psi$.

$\varphi \equiv\psi$ ($\varphi$ is strongly equivalent to $\psi$) if $\varphi \equiv^+\psi$ and $\varphi \equiv^-\psi$.

=== Equivalence of sentences ===
The definitions above specialize for IF sentences as follows. Two IF sentences $\varphi,\psi$ are truth equivalent if they are true in the same structures; they are falsity equivalent if they are false in the same structures; they are strongly equivalent if they are both truth and falsity equivalent.

Intuitively, using strong equivalence amounts to considering IF logic as 3-valued (true/undetermined/false), while truth equivalence treats IF sentences as if they were 2-valued (true/untrue).

=== Equivalence relative to a context ===
Many logical rules of IF logic can be adequately expressed only in terms of more restricted notions of equivalence, which take into account the context in which a formula might appear.

For example, if $U$ is a finite set of variables and $U\supseteq \mbox{Free}(\varphi)\cup\mbox{Free}(\psi)$, one can state that $\varphi$ is truth equivalent to $\psi$ relative to $U$ ($\varphi \equiv_U\psi$) in case $\mathcal M,X\models^+\psi \Leftrightarrow \mathcal M,X\models^+\varphi$ for any structure $\mathcal M$ and any team $X$ of domain $U$.

== Model-theoretic properties ==
=== Sentence level ===
IF sentences can be translated in a truth-preserving fashion into sentences of (functional) existential second-order logic ($\Sigma_1^1$) by means of the Skolemization procedure (see above). Vice versa, every $\Sigma_1^1$ can be translated into an IF sentence by means of a variant of the Walkoe-Enderton translation procedure for partially-ordered quantifiers. In other words, IF logic and $\Sigma_1^1$ are expressively equivalent at the level of sentences. This equivalence can be used to prove many of the properties that follow; they are inherited from $\Sigma_1^1$ and in many cases similar to properties of FOL.

We denote by $T$ a (possibly infinite) set of IF sentences.

- Löwenheim-Skolem property: if $T$ has an infinite model, or arbitrarily large finite models, than it has models of every infinite cardinality.
- Existential compactness: if every finite $T_0\subseteq T$ has a model, then also $T$ has a model.
- Failure of deductive compactness: there are $T,\varphi$ such that $T\models\varphi$, but $T_0\not\models\varphi$ for any finite $T_0\subset T$. This is a difference from FOL.
- Separation theorem: if $\varphi,\psi$ are mutually inconsistent IF sentences, then there is a FOL sentence $\theta$ such that $\varphi\models^+\theta$ and $\psi\models^+\lnot\theta$. This is a consequence of Craig's interpolation theorem for FOL.
- Burgess' theorem: if $\varphi,\psi$ are mutually inconsistent IF sentences, then there is an IF sentence $\theta$ such that $\varphi\equiv^+\theta$ and $\psi\equiv^+\lnot\theta$ (except possibly for one-element structures). In particular, this theorem reveals that the negation of IF logic is not a semantical operation with respect to truth equivalence (truth-equivalent sentences may have non-equivalent negations).
- Definability of truth: there is an IF sentence $TRUE(c)$, in the language of Peano Arithmetic, such that, for any IF sentence $\varphi,$, $\mathbb{N}\models\varphi \Leftrightarrow \mathbb{N}\models TRUE(\ulcorner\varphi\urcorner)$ (where $\ulcorner\urcorner$ denotes a Gödel numbering). A weaker statement also holds for nonstandard models of Peano Arithmetic.

=== Formula level ===
The notion of satisfiability by a team has the following properties:

- Downward closure: if $\mathcal M,X\models^\pm \varphi$ and $Y\subseteq X$, then $\mathcal M,Y\models^\pm \varphi$.
- Consistency: $\mathcal M,X\models^+ \varphi$ and $\mathcal M,X\models^- \varphi$ if and only if $X=\emptyset$.
- Non-locality: there are $\mathcal M,X,\varphi$ such that $\mathcal M,X\models \varphi\not\Leftrightarrow M,X_{\upharpoonright \mbox{Free}(\varphi)}\models \varphi$.

Since IF formulas are satisfied by teams and formulas of classical logics are satisfied by assignments, there is no obvious intertranslation between IF formulas and formulas of some classical logic system. However, there is a translation procedure of IF formulas into sentences of relational $\Sigma_1^1$ (actually, one distinct translation $\tau_{U,R}$ for each finite $U\supseteq \mbox{Free}(\varphi)$ and for each choice of a predicate symbol $R$ of arity $card(U)$). In this kind of translation, an extra n-ary predicate symbol $R$ is used to represent an n-variable team $X$. This is motivated by the fact that, once an ordering $v_1\dots v_n$ of the variables of $dom(X)$ has been fixed, it is possible to associate a relation $Rel_{v_1\dots v_n}(X) = \{(s(v_1),\dots,s(v_n)) | s\in X\}$ to the team $X$. With this conventions, an IF formula is related to its translation thus:

$$\mathcal M,X\models \varphi \Leftrightarrow (\mathcal M,Rel_{v_1\dots v_n}(X))\models \tau_{dom(X),R}(\varphi)$$

where $(M,Rel_{v_1\dots v_n}(X))$ is the expansion of $\mathcal M$ that assigns $Rel_{v_1\dots v_n}(X)$ as interpretation for the predicate $R$.

Through this correlation, it is possible to say that, on a structure $\mathcal M$, an IF formula $\varphi$ of n free variables defines a family of n-ary relations over $\mathcal M$ (the family of the relations $Rel_{v_1\dots v_n}(X)$ such that $\mathcal M,X\models\varphi$).

In 2009, Kontinen and Väänänen, showed, by means of a partial inverse translation procedure, that the families of relations that are definable by IF logic are exactly those that are nonempty, downward closed and definable in relational $\Sigma_1^1$ with an extra predicate $R$ (or, equivalently, nonempty and definable by a $\Sigma_1^1$ sentence in which $R$ occurs only negatively).

== Extended IF logic ==
IF logic is not closed under classical negation. The boolean closure of IF logic is known as extended IF logic and it is equivalent to a proper fragment of $\Delta_2^1$ (Figueira et al. 2011). Hintikka (1996, p. 196) claimed that "virtually all of classical mathematics can in principle be done in extended IF first-order logic".

== Properties and critique ==
A number of properties of IF logic follow from logical equivalence with $\Sigma^1_1$ and bring it closer to first-order logic including a compactness theorem, a Löwenheim–Skolem theorem, and a Craig interpolation theorem. (Väänänen, 2007, p. 86). However, Väänänen (2001) proved that the set of Gödel numbers of valid sentences of IF logic with at least one binary predicate symbol (set denoted by Val_{IF}) is recursively isomorphic with the corresponding set of Gödel numbers of valid (full) second-order sentences in a vocabulary that contains one binary predicate symbol (set denoted by Val^{2}). Furthermore, Väänänen showed that Val^{2} is the complete Π_{2}-definable set of integers, and that it is Val^{2} not in $\Sigma^m_n$ for any finite m and n. Väänänen (2007, pp. 136–139) summarizes the complexity results as follows:

Problem	first-order logic	IF/dependence/ESO logic
Decision	$\Sigma_1^0$ (r.e.)	$\Pi_2$
Non-validity	$\Pi_1^0$ (co-r.e.)	$\Sigma_2$
Consistency	$\Pi_1^0$	$\Pi_1^0$
Inconsistency	$\Sigma_1^0$	$\Sigma_1^0$

Feferman (2006) cites Väänänen's 2001 result to argue (contra Hintikka) that while satisfiability might be a first-order matter, the question of whether there is a winning strategy for Verifier over all structures in general "lands us squarely in full second order logic" (emphasis Feferman's). Feferman also attacked the claimed usefulness of the extended IF logic, because the sentences in $\Pi_1^1$ do not admit a game-theoretic interpretation.

== See also ==
- Game Semantics
- Branching Quantifiers
- Dependence Logic
