= Walter Craig (mathematician) =

Canadian mathematician (1953–2019)

Walter L. Craig FRSC
- Born: 1953; State College, Pennsylvania
- Died: 18 January 2019 (aged 65–66)
- Education: Ph.D. New York University - Courant Institute (1981)
- Years active: 1981-2019
- Known for: Mathematician
- Spouse: Deirdre Haskell
- Father: William Craig

Walter L. Craig FRSC (1953 – January 18, 2019) was a United States born Canadian mathematician and a Canada Research Chair in Mathematical Analysis and Applications at McMaster University, Hamilton, Ontario.

== Personal life ==
Craig was born in State College, Pennsylvania in 1953. His father, a professor at Pennsylvania State University transferred to University of California, Berkeley, where Craig and his siblings were raised starting in 1959.

Craig was the son of the logician William Craig and the husband of mathematician Deirdre Haskell.

== Education ==
Craig attended the University of California at Berkeley and, after spending two years performing as a jazz musician, returned there to graduate with a bachelor's degree in mathematics in 1977. Craig earned his Ph.D. from New York University - Courant Institute in 1981; his dissertation, A Bifurcation Theory for Periodic Dissipative Wave Equations, was supervised by Louis Nirenberg.

== Career ==
After stints at the California Institute of Technology, Stanford University, and Brown University, Craig moved to McMaster University in Hamilton, Ontario, Canada in 2000. His research topics included nonlinear partial differential equations, infinite dimensional Hamiltonian systems, Schrödinger operators and spectral theory, water waves, general relativity, and cosmology.

In 2007, he was made a Fellow of the Royal Society of Canada; he was awarded a Killam Fellowship in 2009.

In 2013, he became one of the inaugural Fellows of the American Mathematical Society. He served as Director of the Fields Institute from 2013 to 2015.
