= Andreas Blass =

German-American mathematician (born 1947)

Andreas R. Blass
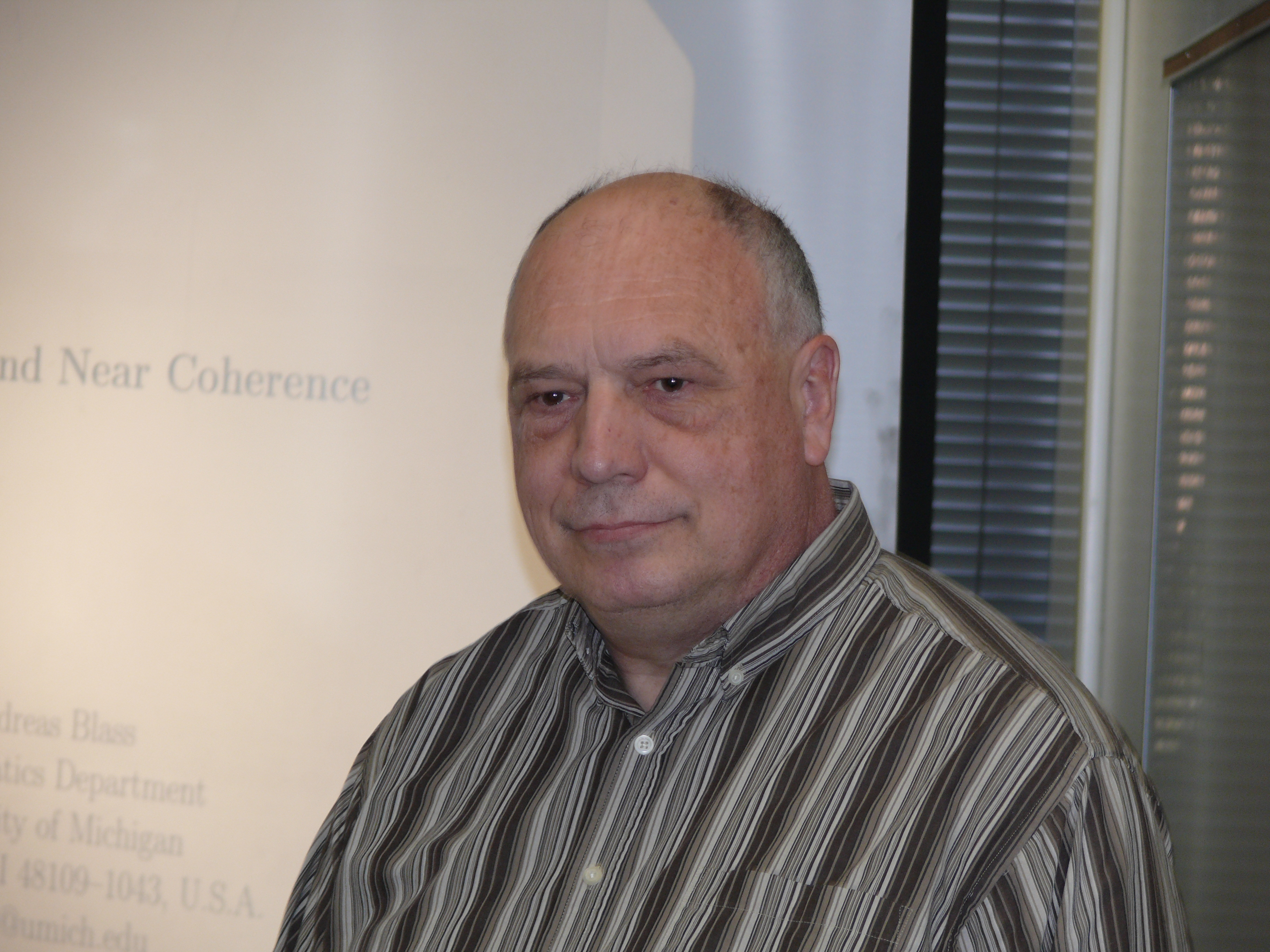
- Blass in 2008
- Born: October 27, 1947 (age 78)
- Education: Harvard University (Ph.D.); University of Detroit (B.S.)
- Scientific career
- Fields: Mathematical logic
- Workplaces: University of Michigan
- Thesis: Orderings of Ultrafilters (1970)
- Doctoral advisor: Frank Wattenberg

Andreas Raphael Blass (born October 27, 1947) is a mathematician, currently a professor at the University of Michigan. He works in mathematical logic, particularly set theory, and theoretical computer science.

Blass graduated from the University of Detroit, where he was a Putnam Fellow in 1965, in 1966 with a B.S. in physics. He received his Ph.D. in 1970 from Harvard University, with a thesis on Orderings of Ultrafilters written under the supervision of Frank Wattenberg. Since 1970 he has been employed by the University of Michigan, first as a T.H. Hildebrandt Research Instructor (1970–72), then assistant professor (1972–76), associate professor (1976–84) and since 1984 he has been a full professor there.

In 2014, he became a Fellow of the American Mathematical Society.

== Selected publications and results ==
In 1984 Blass proved that the existence of a basis for every vector space is equivalent to the axiom of choice. He made important contributions in the development of the set theory of the reals and forcing.

Blass was the first to point out connections between game semantics and linear logic.

He has authored more than 200 research articles in mathematical logic and theoretical computer science, including:

- Blass, Andreas (1984), "Existence of bases implies the axiom of choice" (PDF), Axiomatic set theory, Contemporary Mathematics volume 31, Providence, R.I.: American Mathematical Society, pp. 31–33, ISBN 0-8218-5026-1, MR 0763890
- Blass, Andreas; Shelah, Saharon (1987). "There may be simple $P_{\aleph_1}$- and $P_{\aleph_2}$-points and the Rudin–Keisler ordering may be downward directed". Annals of Pure and Applied Logic. 33: 213–243. doi:10.1016/0168-0072(87)90082-0. hdl:2027.42/26916.
- Blass, Andreas (1992). "A game semantics for linear logic". Annals of Pure and Applied Logic. 56 (1–3): 183–220. doi:10.1016/0168-0072(92)90073-9. hdl:2027.42/30097.
- Blass, Andreas; Gurevich, Yuri (2003). "Algorithms: a quest for absolute definitions" (PDF). Bull. Eur. Assoc. Theor. Comput. Sci. EATCS. 81: 195–225.
