= Jaakko Hintikka =

Finnish and American philosopher and logician (1929–2015)

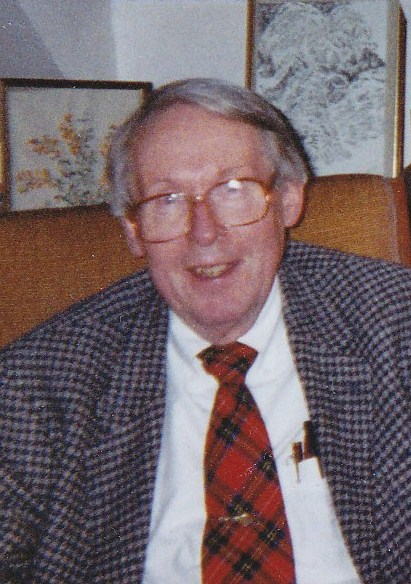
- Jaakko Hintikka in 2003
- Born: Jaakko Kaarlo Juhani Hintikka; 12 January 1929; Helsingin maalaiskunta, Finland
- Died: 12 August 2015 (aged 86); Porvoo, Finland
- Awards: Harvard Junior Fellow (1956); Rolf Schock Prize (2005); Library of Living Philosophers (2006)

Education
- Education: University of Helsinki (PhD)
- Thesis: Distributive Normal Forms in the Calculus of Predicates (1953)
- Doctoral advisor: Georg Henrik von Wright

Philosophical work
- Era: 20th-century philosophy
- Region: Western philosophy
- School: Analytic philosophy
- Institutions: University of Helsinki (1959–1970); Stanford University (1965–1982); Florida State University (1978–1990); Boston University (1990–2015)
- Doctoral students: Barry Loewer; Terence Parsons
- Main interests: Philosophy; Logic
- Notable ideas: Hintikka set; Game semantics; Epistemic logic; Independence-friendly logic

Kaarlo Jaakko Juhani Hintikka (/ˈhɪntɪkə/; Finnish: [ˈhintikːɑ]; 12 January 1929 – 12 August 2015) was a Finnish and American philosopher and logician. Hintikka is regarded as the founder of formal epistemic logic and of game semantics for logic. He was awarded the Rolf Schock Prize for philosophy in 2005, and he was chief editor of the philosophical journal Synthese 1965–2002.

== Early life and education ==
Hintikka was born in Helsingin maalaiskunta (now Vantaa) outside of Helsinki, Finland on 12 January 1929.

In 1953, he received his doctorate from the University of Helsinki for a thesis on predicate logic entitled Distributive Normal Forms in the Calculus of Predicates. He was a student of Georg Henrik von Wright. After his doctoral study, he became a Junior Fellow at Harvard University (1956–1959).

== Career ==
Hintikka held professorial appointments at the University of Helsinki (1959–1970), Stanford University (1965–1982, partially visiting), Florida State University (1978–1990), and finally Boston University from 1990 until his death in 2015. He was the prolific author or co-author of over 30 books and over 300 scholarly articles. Hintikka contributed to mathematical logic, philosophical logic, the philosophy of mathematics, epistemology, language theory, and the philosophy of science. His works have appeared in over nine languages. In 2005, he won the Rolf Schock Prize in logic and philosophy "for his pioneering contributions to the logical analysis of modal concepts, in particular the concepts of knowledge and belief".

Hintikka served as chief editor of the philosophical journal Synthese from 1965 to 2002, and he was a consultant editor for more than ten journals. He was a vice president of the Association for Symbolic Logic (1968–1971), a member of the American Philosophical Association and president of its Pacific division (1975–1976), a member of the governing board of the Philosophy of Science Association (1970–1974), president of the Florida Philosophical Association (1984–1985), the first vice-president of the Fédération Internationale des Sociétés de Philosophie (1993–1998), a vice-president and president of the Institut International de Philosophie (1993–1996; 1999–2002), as well as a president of the Charles S. Peirce Society (1997) and the International Union of History and Philosophy of Science.

He was a member of the Norwegian Academy of Science and Letters. On May 26, 2000, Hintikka received an honorary doctorate from the Faculty of History and Philosophy at Uppsala University, Sweden.

== Death ==
Hintikka died on 12 August 2015 in Porvoo, Finland.

== Philosophical work ==
Early in his career, he devised a semantics of modal logic essentially analogous to Saul Kripke's frame semantics, and discovered the now widely taught semantic tableau independently of Evert Willem Beth. Later, he worked mainly on game semantics, and on independence-friendly logic, known for its "branching quantifiers", which he believed do better justice to our intuitions about quantifiers than does conventional first-order logic. He did important exegetical work on Aristotle, Immanuel Kant, Ludwig Wittgenstein, and Charles Sanders Peirce. Hintikka's work can be seen as a continuation of the analytic tendency in philosophy founded by Franz Brentano and Peirce, advanced by Gottlob Frege and Bertrand Russell, and continued by Rudolf Carnap, Willard Van Orman Quine, and by Hintikka's teacher Georg Henrik von Wright. In 1998, for instance, he wrote The Principles of Mathematics Revisited, which takes an exploratory stance comparable to that Russell adopted in his The Principles of Mathematics in 1903.

== Selected books ==
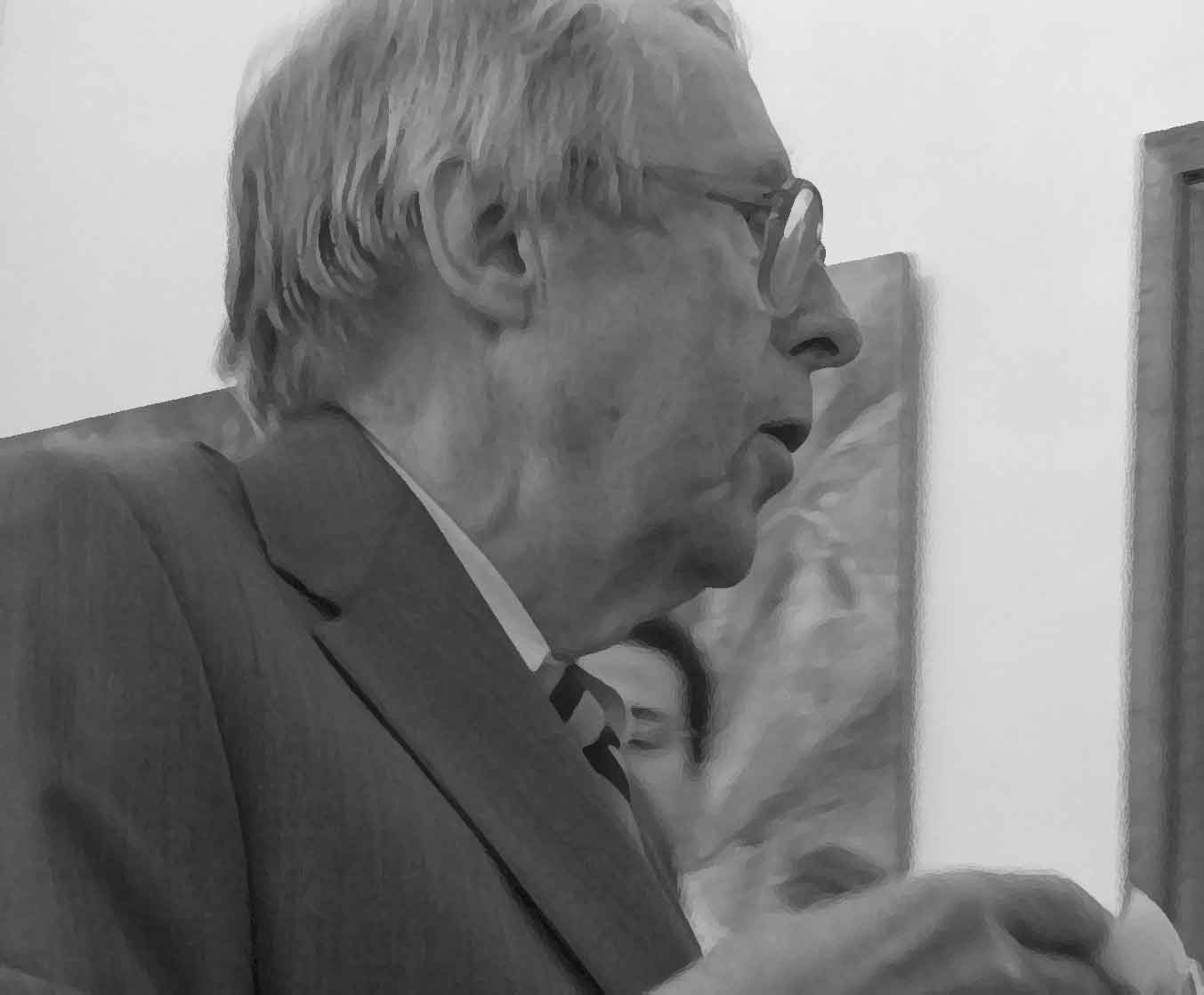
Hintikka in 2006

For a bibliography, see Auxier and Hahn (2006).

- 1962. Knowledge and Belief – An Introduction to the Logic of the Two Notions ISBN 1-904987-08-7
- 1969. Models for Modalities: Selected Essays ISBN 978-90-277-0598-3
- 1973 Logic, Language-Games and Information: Kantian Themes in the Philosophy of Logic ISBN 978-0198243649
- 1975. The intentions of intentionality and other new models for modalities ISBN 978-90-277-0634-8
- 1976. The semantics of questions and the questions of semantics: case studies in the interrelations of logic, semantics, and syntax ISBN 978-95-1950-535-0
- 1989. The Logic of Epistemology and the Epistemology of Logic ISBN 0-7923-0040-8
- 1996. Ludwig Wittgenstein: Half-Truths and One-and-a-Half-Truths ISBN 0-7923-4091-4
- 1996. Lingua Universalis vs Calculus Ratiocinator ISBN 0-7923-4246-1
- 1996. The Principles of Mathematics Revisited ISBN 0-521-62498-3
- 1998. Paradigms for Language Theory and Other Essays ISBN 0-7923-4780-3
- 1998. Language, Truth and Logic in Mathematics ISBN 0-7923-4766-8
- 1999. Inquiry as Inquiry: A Logic of Scientific Discovery ISBN 0-7923-5477-X
- 2004. Analyses of Aristotle ISBN 1-4020-2040-6
- 2007. Socratic Epistemology: Explorations of Knowledge-Seeking by Questioning ISBN 978-0-521-61651-5

== See also ==
- Doxastic logic
- Dependence logic
