= Interactive computation =

In computer science, interactive computation is a mathematical model for computation that involves input/output communication with the external world during computation.

== Uses ==
Among the currently studied mathematical models of computation that attempt to capture interaction are Giorgi Japaridze's hard- and easy-play machines elaborated within the framework of computability logic, Dina Q. Goldin's Persistent Turing Machines (PTMs), and Yuri Gurevich's abstract state machines. Peter Wegner has additionally done a great deal of work on this area of computer science.

== See also ==
- Cirquent calculus
- Computability logic
- Game semantics
- Human-based computation
- Hypercomputation
- Interactive programming
- Membrane computing
- Quasi-empiricism
- RE (complexity)
- Super-recursive algorithm
