= Wilfrid Hodges =

British mathematician and logician (1941-1988)

Wilfrid Hodges FBA
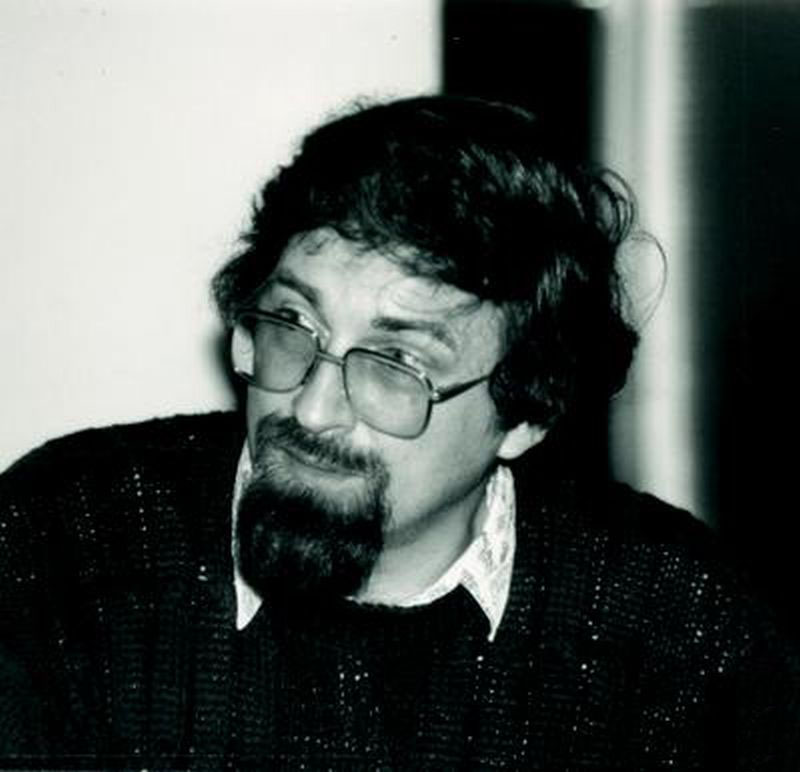
- Wilfrid Hodges, 1988 at the MFO
- Born: Wilfrid Augustine Hodges; 27 May 1941 (age 85)
- Education: New College, Oxford
- Father: H. A. Hodges
- Scientific career
- Fields: Model theory
- Doctoral advisor: John Crossley
- Doctoral students: Alex Wilkie

President of the DLMPST/IUHPST
- In office 2008–2011
- Preceded by: Adolf Grünbaum
- Succeeded by: Elliott Sober

Wilfrid Augustine Hodges (born 27 May 1941) is a British mathematician and logician known for his work in model theory.

== Life ==
Hodges attended New College, Oxford (1959–65), where he received degrees in both Literae Humaniores and (Christianic) Theology. In 1970 he was awarded a doctorate for a thesis in Logic. He lectured in both Philosophy and Mathematics at Bedford College, University of London. He has held visiting appointments in the department of philosophy at the University of California, Los Angeles and in the department of mathematics at University of Colorado. Hodges was Professor of Mathematics at Queen Mary College, University of London from 1987 to 2006 and is the author of books on logic.

== Honors and awards ==
Hodges was President of the British Logic Colloquium, of the European Association for Logic, Language and Information and of the Division of Logic, Methodology, and Philosophy of Science. In 2009 he was elected a Fellow of the British Academy.

== Writing style ==
Hodges' books are written in an informal style. The "Notes on Notation" in his book "Model theory" end with the following characteristic sentence:

'I' means I, 'we' means we.

When this 780-page book appeared in 1993, it became one of the standard textbooks on model theory. Due to its success an abbreviated version (but with a new chapter on stability theory) was published as a paperback.

== Bibliography ==
Only first editions are listed.

- — (1977). Logic – An Introduction to Elementary Logic. Penguin Books.
- — (1985). Building Models by Games. London Mathematical Society Student Texts. Cambridge University Press. ISBN 9780521268974.
- — (1993). Model Theory. Encyclopedia of Mathematics. Cambridge University Press. ISBN 0-521-30442-3. LCCN 91-25082.
- — (1997). A Shorter Model Theory. Cambridge University Press. ISBN 0-521-58713-1.
- Chiswell, Ian; — (2007). Mathematical Logic. Oxford University Press. ISBN 978-0-19-921562-1.

== See also ==
- C. C. Chang

Academic offices
Preceded by Adolf Grünbaum	President of the Division for Logic, Methodology and Philosophy of Science and Technology of the International Union for History and Philosophy of Science and Technology (DLMPST/IUHPST); 2008–2011	Succeeded by Elliott Sober
