= Arnon =

Arnon is a Hebrew given name and surname. Notable people with the name include:

== Given name ==
- Arnon Afek
- Arnon Avron
- Arnon Bar-David
- Arnon Efrati
- Arnon Erez
- Arnon Gafni
- Arnon Grunberg
- Arnon Goldfinger
- Arnon Mantver
- Arnon Milchan
- Arnon Mishkin
- Arnon Mozes (born 1953), Israeli media businessman
- Arnon Nampa
- Arnon Ohad
- Arnon Rosenthal
- Arnon Soffer
- Arnon Tamir
- Arnon de Melo

== Surname ==
- Avraham Arnon (1887–1960), Israeli educator
- Baruch Arnon (born 1940), Jewish American pianist and music teacher
- Daniel I. Arnon (1910–1994), a biologist, associated with photosynthesis and plant nutrition
- Itzhak Arnon (1909–2005), Israeli agronomist
- Poj Arnon (born 1970), Thai film director
- Ruth Arnon (born 1933), Israeli biochemist
- Yehudit Arnon (1926–2013), Israeli dancer and choreographer
- Yigal Arnon (1929–2014), Israeli lawyer

== See also ==
- Arnnon Geshuri, American corporate executive
- Arnon River or Stream, ancient name of Wadi Mujib in Jordan, occurring in the Hebrew Bible
