= Claudio Herrera (musician) =

Mexican pianist

Claudio Herrera is a Mexican pianist born in Durango where he began his musical studies. Later he traveled to Europe to continue his training in France, Italy and Ukraine with renowned teachers such as Catherine Thibone, Minique, Debus, Ugo Cidivino, Sergei Polusmiak, Vlado Perlemuter, great student of Maurice Ravel, Sergei Polusmiak and Alfred Cortot, with the pianistic tradition of V. Horowitzt. Claudio Herrera has performed on numerous occasions in Europe, North Africa, Asia, United States, Cuba and Mexico.

He was a jury member in national and international piano competitions; member of Mexican Culture Seminar; founder of Novak Foundation in Cuernavaca, Morelos, of National Piano Competition Claudio Herrera and member of the group of concertists of INBA. Currently he has a repertoire that is over eighty orchestral concert programs, recitals and chamber music. He has recorded in Spain, USA and Mexico.

He has performed as a duet with his virtuous sister, pianist Salomé Herrera, forming the Duo Herrera.

In 2011 he gave his first concert in New York City, at the Weill Recital Hall at Carnegie Hall, celebrating the bicentennial of the birth of composer Franz Liszt, and a tribute to Frédéric Chopin and his teacher, Vlado Perlemuter.
