= Salomé Herrera =

Mexican Musician

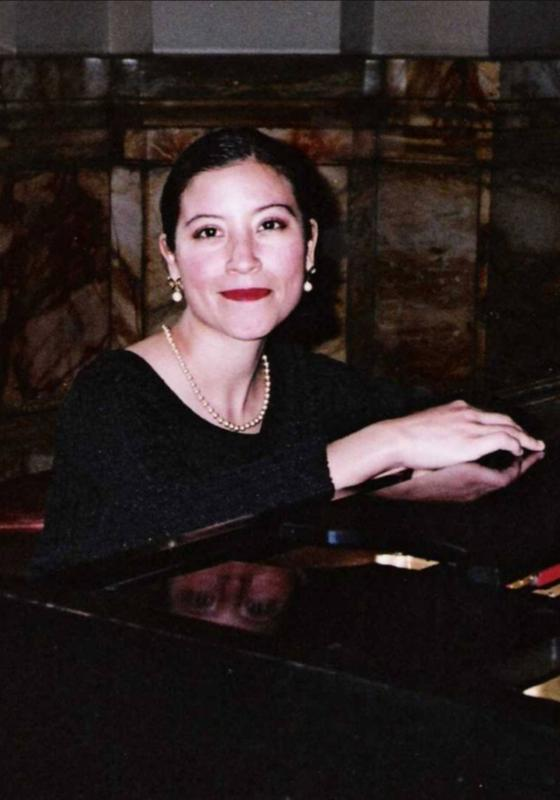
Herrera in 2013

Salomé Herrera is a Mexican pianist and educator recognized for her international awards and performances of Johann Sebastian Bach's works. She studied in Mexico, Italy, and France, winning first prize with a gold medal at the Conservatoire de Paris under teachers including Ugo Cividino, Dominique Geoffroy, and Catherine Thibon.

== Biography ==
She studied in Mexico, Italy and France where she won the first prize with gold medal in the Conservatoire de Paris. She was student of Ugo Cividino, Dominique Geoffroy and Catherine Thibon (notable student of Vlado Perlemuter), mainly. She participated in master classes of Walter Panhofer at the Academy of Music in Vienna, and of Anikó Szegedi in the Franz Liszt Academy of Music in Budapest.

She was selected as one of the best students of Europe to participate in the workshop of Villecroze, France, given in that time by Olivier Gardon. She has been a judge of ingress and egress contests in several conservatories in France.

In Mexico, she was worthy to mention of excellence of National Youth Award and fellow of the "Fondo Nacional para la Cultura y las Artes". Since 1984, she performs regularly as a soloist with orchestra, in chamber music recitals and solo piano music mainly of Johann Sebastian Bach. Also formed a duo, piano four hands and two pianos, with Claudio Herrera at the "Dúo Herrera". She's a member of the group of Concert Artists of Fine Arts of the "Coordinación Nacional de Música y Ópera del INBA."
