= Arnon (disambiguation) =

Arnon is a Hebrew given name and surname.

Arnon may also refer to:

- Arnon (river), central France
- Arnon lake, Switzerland.
- Arnon Street, Belfast, Northern Ireland, the place of the 1922 Arnon Street killings
- Wadi Mujib, river and wadi in Jordan, historically known as Arnon

== See also ==
- Arnona
- Arnone
