= Ilona Vincze-Krausz =

Hungarian-Israeli piano teacher (1902–1998)

Ilona Vincze-Krausz or Kraus (née Krausz; Hebrew: אילונה וינצה-קראוס; 14 December 1902 – 17 August 1998, Israel) was a Hungarian-Israeli teacher of current classical piano pedagogues.

== Education and professional history ==
Vincze-Krausz was born in Budapest, Austria-Hungary in 1902, the daughter of Isidore Eduard Krausz and Lina Karolina Krausz (née Lefkovitz). She studied at the Royal Academy of Music in Budapest and performed recitals throughout Europe. She was a student of Béla Bartók. After fleeing to Palestine in 1936 with her husband and son, she became a professor at the Palestine Conservatory in Jerusalem and later taught at the Academy of Music in Tel-Aviv. Her students include Dan Gottfried, Arie Vardi, Naomi Shemer, Baruch Arnon, Avi Schönfeld, Yoheved Kaplinsky and Issak Tavior.

She was married to cellist László Vincze.
