= Malben =

Israeli agency for the care of aged, weak, and disabled immigrants

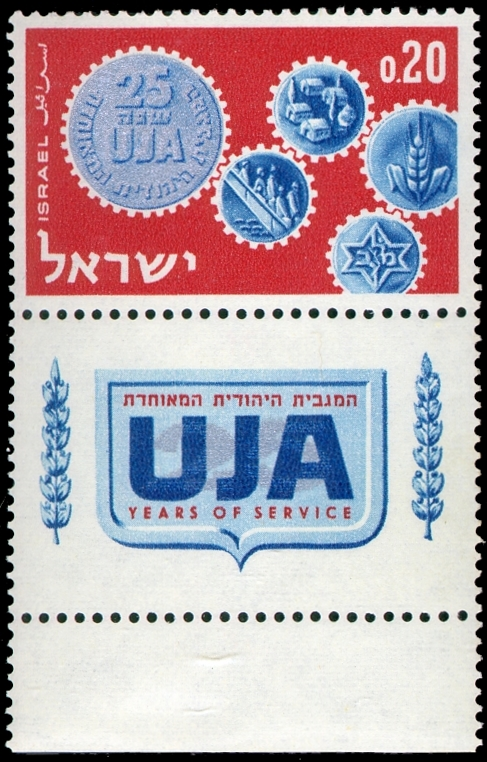
A UJA stamp with Malben logo in the lower right corner

Malben (Hebrew: מלב"ן, a Hebrew-language acronym for Hebrew: מוֹסְדוֹת לְטִפּוּל בְּעוֹלִים נֶחֱשָׁלִים, romanized: Mosdot le-ṭipul be-ʻolim neḥshalim, lit. 'Institutions for the Care of Handicapped Immigrants') was an agency for the care of aged, weak, and disabled immigrants in Israel. Created in 1949 by the efforts of the American Jewish Joint Distribution Committee (JDC) and the United Jewish Appeal (UJA), it operated until 1975, when all its facilities and programs were transferred to the Israeli government and local authorities.

== Background ==
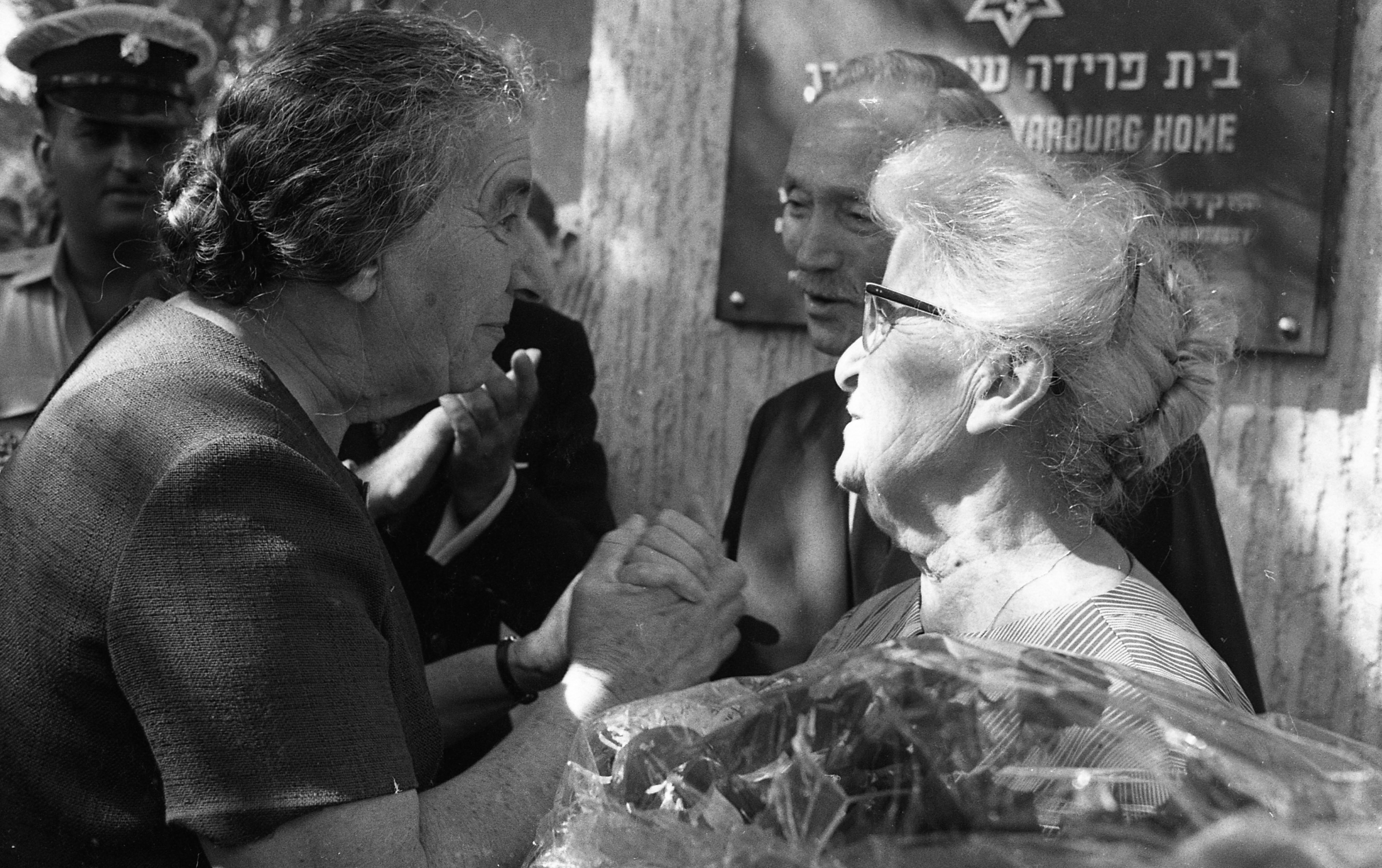
Golda Meir at a Malben event in Netanya, 1969

Following the establishment of the State of Israel, the 1948 Arab–Israeli War had led to the sharp increase of antisemitism in the region, expressed, e.g., in anti-Jewish riots in Aden, Morocco, and Tripoli. Nearly the entire Jewish population of Libya, 31,000 persons, immigrated to Israel within a few years. The JDC and Israel organized Operation Magic Carpet, the June 1948 airlift of 50,000 Yemenite Jews to Israel. In all, more than 300,000 Jews left North Africa for Israel. Thousands more Iraqi and Kurdish Jews were transported through Operation Ezra, also funded by JDC.

This massive aliyah included large numbers of incapacitated people, adding to the numbers of the Holocaust survivor families and those arriving from the displacement camps. These included huge numbers of people sick with tuberculosis acquired in Nazi ghettos and concentration camps, as well as in Middle East ghettos. All these overwhelmed the capacities of the newborn state, and the Israeli government asked JDC for assistance.

== Activities ==
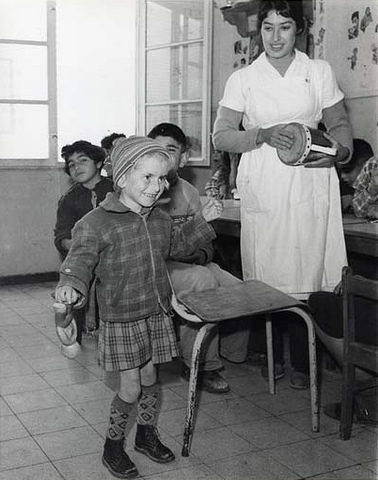
Children at Kfar Salma (Kfar HaShvedi, "the Swedish Village"), a Malben institution for special needs children in Jerusalem

Malben established about a hundred of institutions for elderly and disabled new immigrants, including homes for the aged (moshav z'kenim), hospitals, tuberculosis sanatoriums, sheltered workshops, and rehabilitation centers. Many of these were based on converted army barracks and other available buildings.

After the direct emergency needs were handled, Malben started to cooperate with municipal and regional authorities to expand the direct services. In addition indirect measures to help aged and disabled people to live a normal life, such as cash relief, loans, etc.

In 1964 a Harvard University consultant surveyed the needs of children with disabilities by the request of JDC, and as a result a number of Children Development Centers were created.

During 1949-1968 Malben helped some 250,000 or nearly 20% of 1.3 million new immigrants spending $164 million.
