= Peter Feuchtwanger =

German musician and music educator (1930–2016)

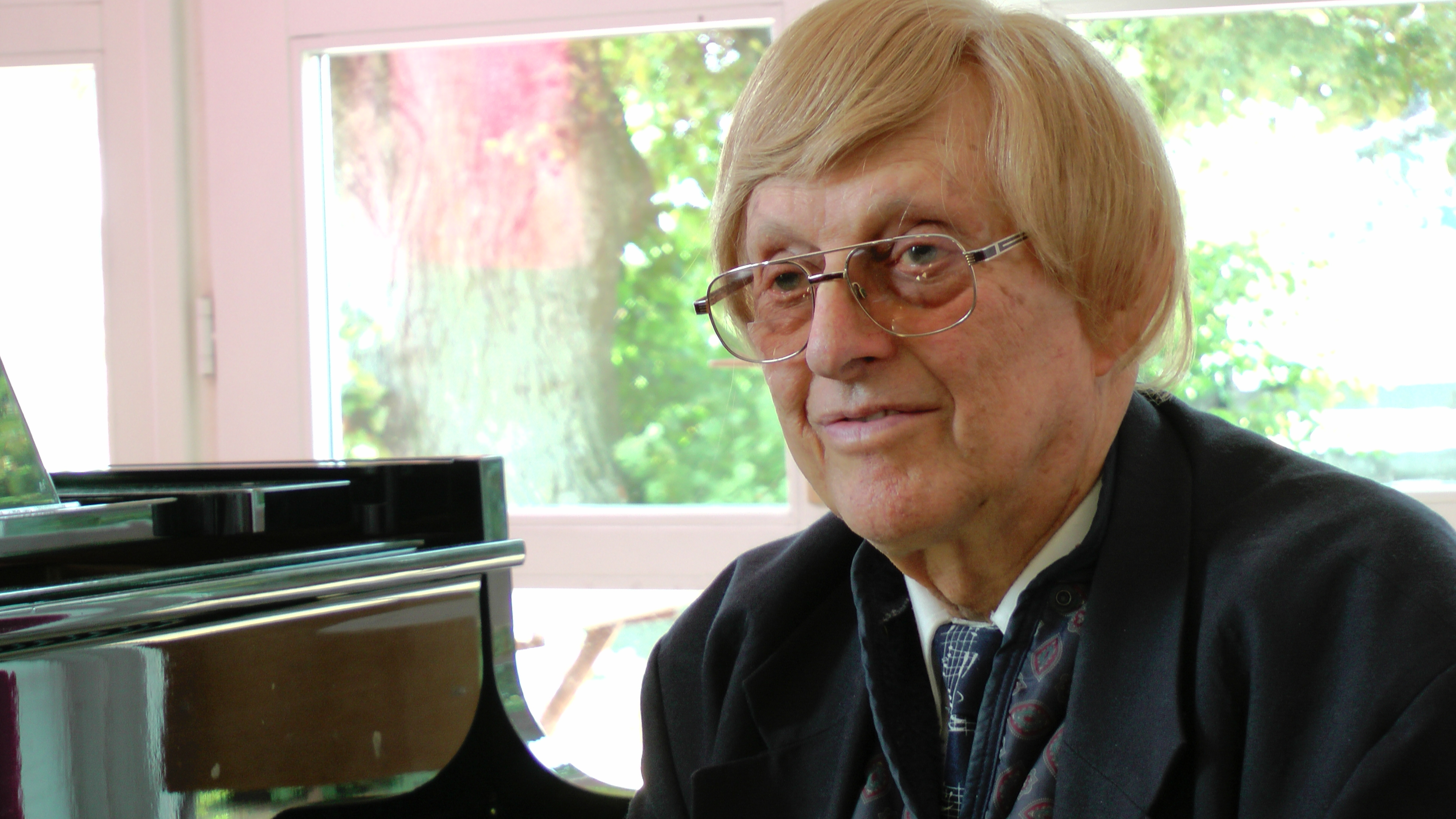
Feuchtwanger, 2012

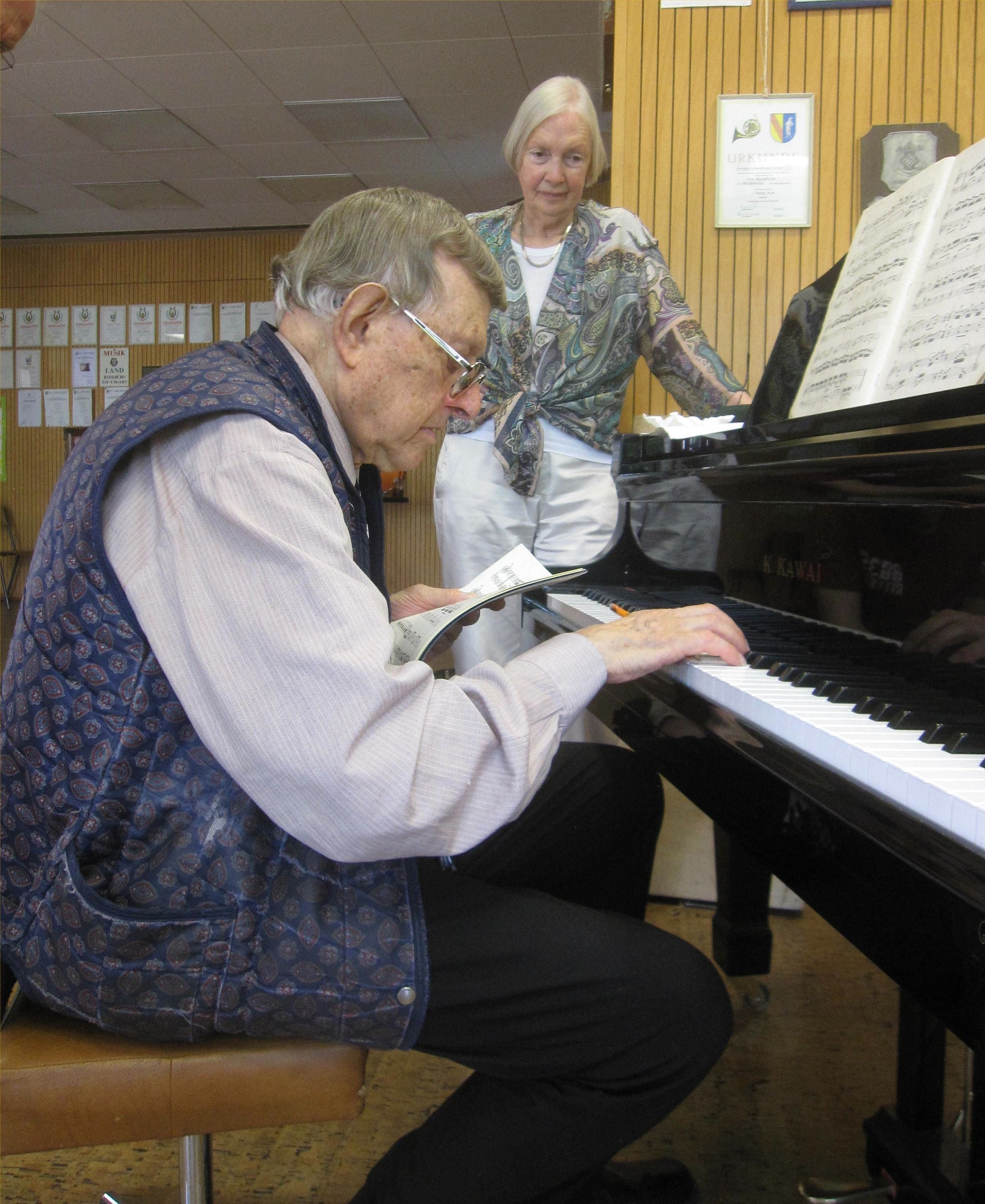
Feuchtwanger, 2014

Peter Bernhard Feuchtwanger (26 June 1930 – 18 June 2016) was a German-Jewish pianist, composer, and piano pedagogue who lived for many years in London.

== Life and work ==
Feuchtwanger was born in Munich as the son of a local bank director, Theodore Feuchtwanger (1858–1956). During World War II, the family fled to Haifa, Israel. Peter Feuchtwanger was initially self-taught, and later studied with eminent pianists. He also developed exercises to help pianists learn a natural effortless technique and also help pianists who have physical problems due to their approach to playing.

Feuchtwanger's piano teachers included Edwin Fischer and Walter Gieseking, but especially inspiring were the pianist Clara Haskil, who practiced on her concert tours in England with him, and the contralto Kathleen Ferrier. He studied composition with Hans Heimler, Lennox Berkeley and Paul Müller-Zürich. He broke early from a career as a pianist to devote himself to composition and music education. He was a follower of Zen and dealt with music and philosophy from India and the Arab world. His Variation on an Eastern Folk Tune (Books 1 and 2) won first prize at the Viotti International Music Competition in 1959.

He worked extensively with the American pianist and composer Carter Larsen and the Argentine pianist Martha Argerich before her breakthrough in the Chopin Competition in 1965. In the same year, he helped Youra Guller's late comeback in London. He was one of pianist Issak Tavior's instructors. He also helped Shura Cherkassky to overcome his nerves; and coached David Helfgott. Yehudi Menuhin invited him in 1966 to write a work for Violin, Sitar, Tabla and Tanpura for the Bath International Music Festival. It was first performed by Menuhin and Ravi Shankar. In 2003, with Professor Günter Reinhold, he founded the International Academy of Music Education in Karlsruhe. He was Visiting Professor at the Yehudi Menuhin School in Surrey and at the Mozarteum University of Salzburg. He held part-time professorships at conservatoriums in Karlsruhe and Basel. From 1967, he gave Master Classes throughout the world. He developed a novel technique of piano playing, which led to the publication of special piano exercises. He was the vice president of the European Piano Teachers Association (West London).

Feuchtwanger died at the age of 85 in his penthouse in Ennismore Gardens, South Kensington, London. Throughout his difficult illness, he was supported by his partner, the artist Michael Garady. Peter was interred at the Brompton Cemetery.
