= American Jewish Joint Distribution Committee =

Jewish relief organization based in New York City

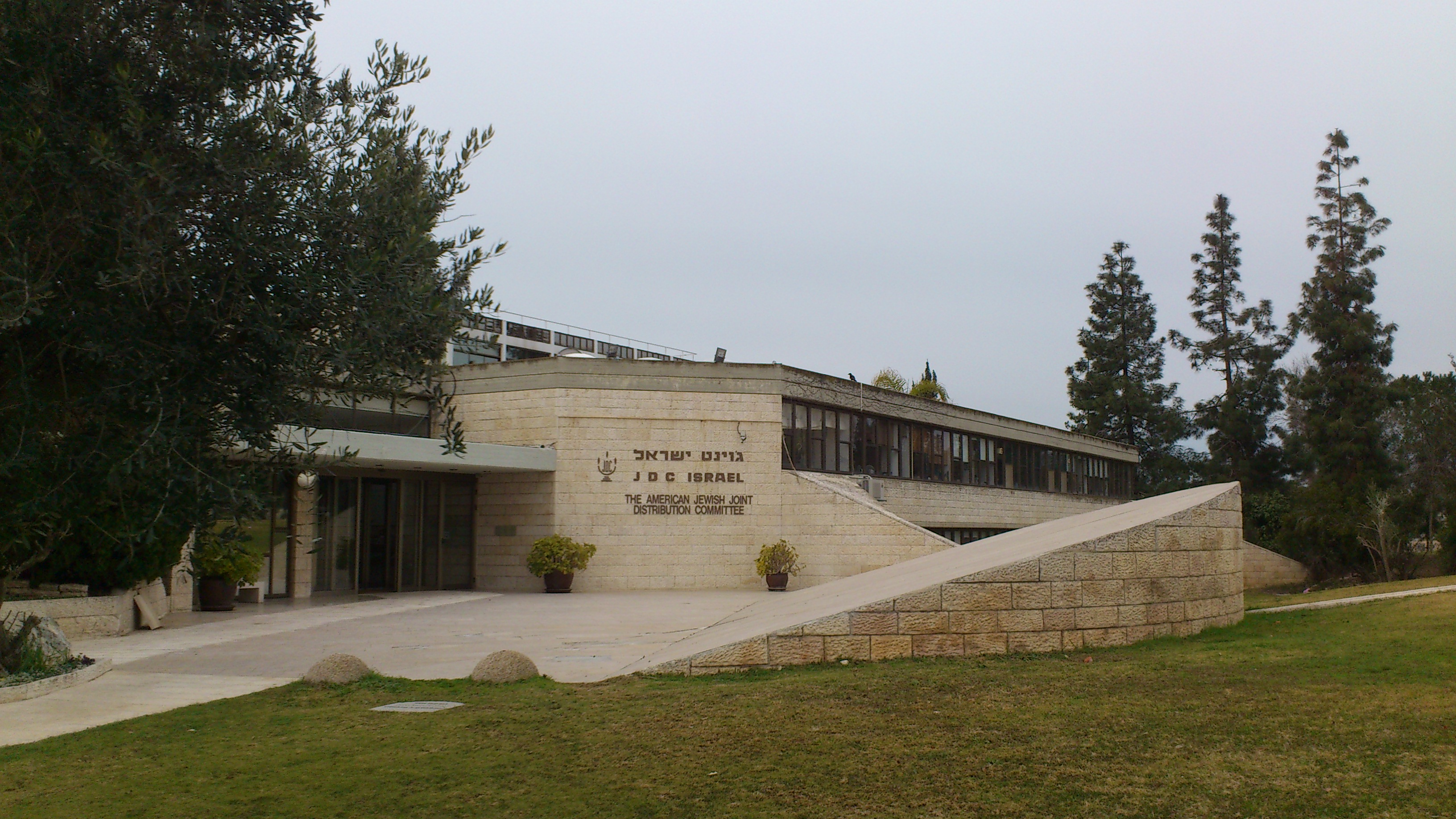
- JDC offices in Jerusalem
- Abbreviation: JDC
- Formation: 1914; 112 years ago
- Founder: Jacob Schiff
- Type: Non-profit organization
- Purpose: Jewish relief and humanitarian aid
- Headquarters: New York City, United States
- Services: Social and community assistance, disaster relief, development assistance
- Fields: Jewish communities worldwide
- Website: www.jdc.org

American Jewish Joint Distribution Committee, also known as Joint or JDC, is a Jewish relief organization based in New York City. The organisation has supported Jewish people living in Israel and throughout the world since 1914, and is active in more than 70 countries.

The JDC offers aid to Jewish populations in Central and Eastern Europe, as well as in the Middle East, through a network of social and community assistance programs. In addition, the JDC contributes millions of dollars in disaster relief and development assistance to non-Jewish communities.

== Mission ==
The JDC has a four-pronged mission:

- Rescue of Jews at risk. JDC's expertise is crisis response. JDC works with local partner agencies to address immediate needs.
- Relief for Jews in need. In addition to emergency aid, JDC support builds the capacity of local agencies to sustain and enhance quality of life for struggling communities.
- Renewal of Jewish community life.
- Israel JDC works in partnership with the Israeli government and other local organizations to improve the lives of the elderly, immigrants, children at risk, the disabled, and the chronically unemployed. In 2007, the JDC was awarded the Israel Prize for its lifetime achievements and special contribution to society and the State of Israel.

=== Leadership ===
The organisation was led by Moses A. Leavitt until his death in 1965, and was succeeded by Charles H. Jordan. Jordan died in Prague in 1967, which was declared a suicide by the Czechoslovak government, in the context of communist denouncements of the JDC at the time, The New York Times reported his death as mysterious. Czechoslovak defector Josef Frolík advised the Central Intelligence Agency in 1974 that Jordan had been abducted by Palestinian agents and died during interrogation at the Egyptian embassy in Prague.

Arnon Mantver was its director from 1995 to 2014.

== History ==
The JDC was founded in 1914, initially to provide assistance to Jews living in Palestine under the rule of the Ottoman Empire.

The organization began its efforts to save Jews with a donation of $50,000 from Jacob Schiff, a wealthy Jewish entrepreneur and philanthropist. He was the main funder of the organization and helped raise money to aid and save Jews around the world. Additionally, the American Jewish Relief Committee helped collect funds for the JDC. Several wealthy, Reform Jews founded the American Jewish Relief Committee on October 25, 1914. Schiff was one of these men, along with Louis Marshall, the president of the committee, and Felix M. Warburg. The Central Relief Committee, founded on October 4, 1914, also helped provide funds to the JDC. Eastern European Orthodox Jews, such as Leon Kamaiky, founded this organization.

Almost one year later, in August 1915, the socialist People's Relief Committee, headed by Meyer London, joined in to provide funds to the committee. After a few years, the JDC and the organizations assisting it had raised significant funds and were able to make a noteworthy impact. The charity had transferred $76,000 to Romania, $1,532,300 to Galicia, $2,5532,000 to Russia, and $3,000,000 to German-occupied Poland and Lithuania by the end of 1917. The JDC had sent nearly $5,000,000 to assist the Jews in Poland by 1920. During the emergency relief period, the JDC had disbursed over $22,000,000 to help in restoration and relief across Europe, between 1919 and 1920.

Approximately 59,000 Jews were living in the land of palestine under Ottoman rule by 1914. The Yishuv was largely made up of Jews that had emigrated from Europe and were largely dependent on sources abroad for their income. The outbreak of World War I destroyed those channels, leaving the community isolated and destitute. With disaster looming, the Yishuv's leaders appealed to Henry Morgenthau, Sr., then the U.S. ambassador to Turkey. Morgenthau was moved and appalled by the misery he witnessed, and sent an urgent cable to New York-based Jewish philanthropist Jacob Schiff, requesting $50,000 of aid to keep them from starvation and death.

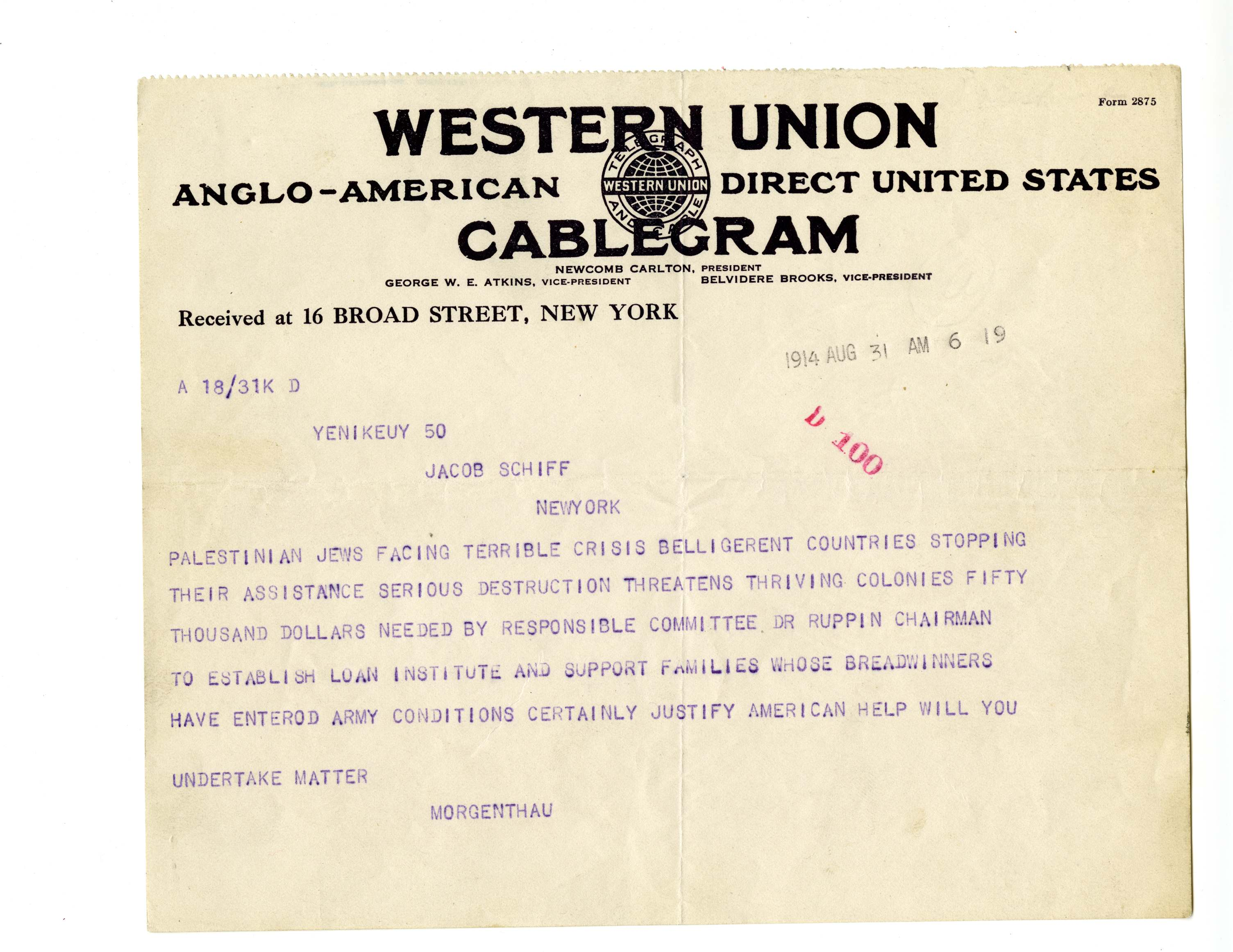
The 1914 telegram that prompted the establishment of the Joint Distribution Committee.

Dated August 31, 1914, the Western Union cablegram read, in part:

PALESTINIAN JEWS FACING TERRIBLE CRISIS ... BELLIGERENT COUNTRIES STOPPING THEIR ASSISTANCE ... SERIOUS DESTRUCTION THREATENS THRIVING COLONIES ... FIFTY THOUSAND DOLLARS NEEDED.

The plea found concerned ears in the U.S. A month later, $50,000 was raised through the efforts of what was intended to be an ad hoc and temporary collective of three existing religious and secular Jewish organizations: the American Jewish Relief Committee, the Central Committee for the Relief of Jews Suffering Through the War, and People's Relief Committee.

A greater crisis arose in 1915 when the Jewish communities of the Pale of Settlement in Russia became caught up in the fighting along the Eastern Front. Under the leadership of Judah Magnes, the Committee was able to raise another five million dollars by the end of the year. Following the Russian Civil War, the Committee was one of only two organizations left in America sending aid to combat the Russian famine of 1921–1922.

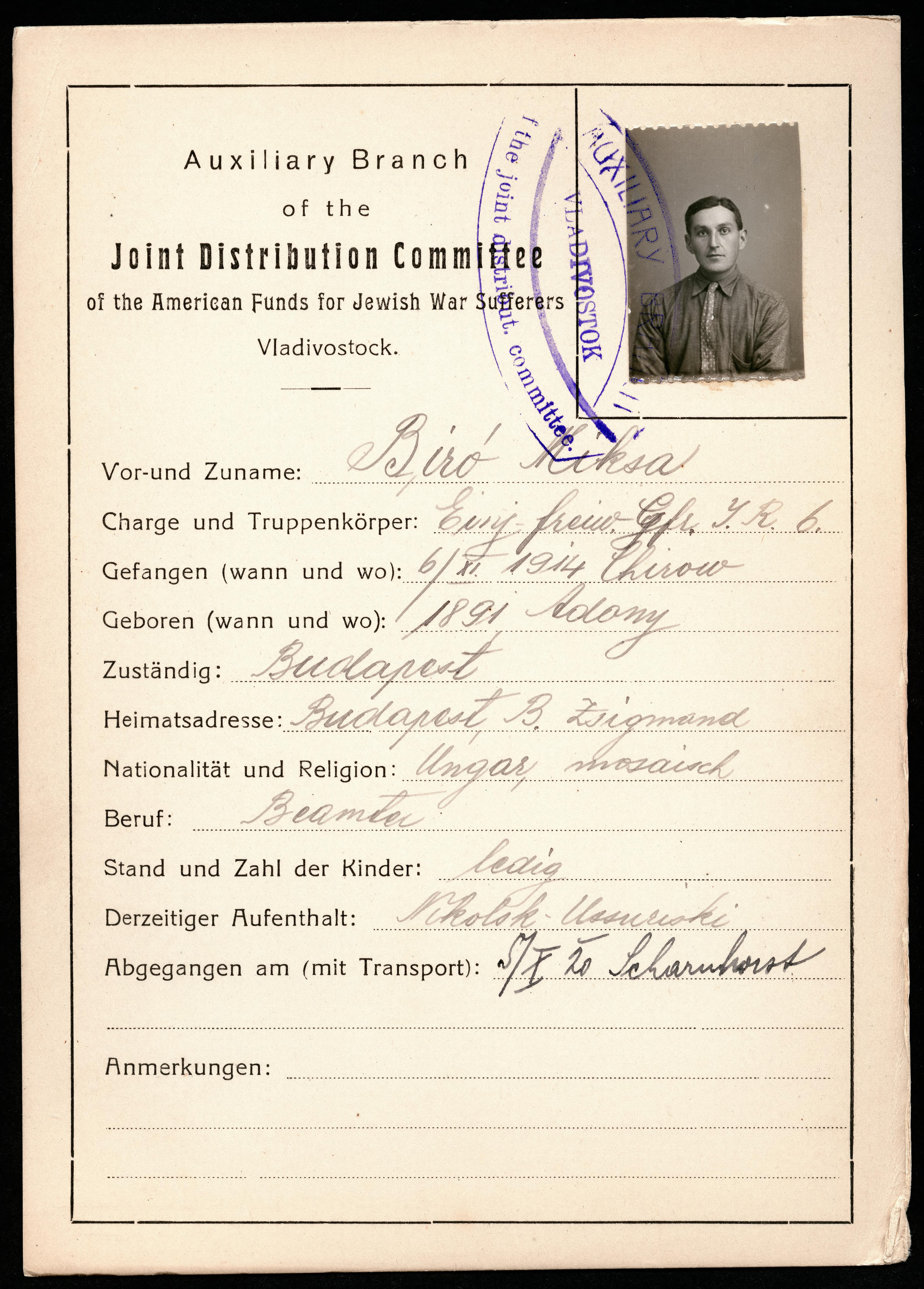
Card issued to a Hungarian prisoner of war by the Vladivostok branch of the Joint Distribution Committee of the American Funds for Jewish War Sufferers, 1920

The Joint Distribution Committee finances programs to assist impoverished Jews in the former Soviet Union, Central and Eastern Europe, providing food, medicine, home care, and other critical aid to elderly Jews and children in need. The JDC also enables small Jewish populations in Latin America, Africa, and Asia to maintain essential social services and help ensure a Jewish future for their youth and posterity. In Israel, JDC responds to crisis-related needs while helping to improve services to the elderly, children and youth, new immigrants, the disabled, and other vulnerable populations.

In the spirit of tikkun olam, a Hebrew phrase used by social justice activists to refer to a moral responsibility to repair the world and alleviate suffering, the JDC has contributed funding and expertise in humanitarian crises such as the 2004 Indian Ocean earthquake and tsunami, Cyclone Nargis, the Darfur genocide, the escalating violence in Georgia and the 2011 Tōhoku earthquake and tsunami.

=== Agro-Joint ===
The Soviet government wanted to control the JDC in the 1920s and how it was working with the Jews living in the Soviet Union. The JDC had agreed to work with an organization known as the Jewish Public Committee, which was controlled by the Bolsheviks. By agreeing to do this, the JDC was able to assist Jews, while being supervised by the Bolsheviks, which appeased the Soviet Union.

World War I plunged Eastern Europe into chaos and subjected Jewish communities across the region to intense poverty, famine, and inflamed anti-Semitism. The October Revolution and other subsequent conflicts fanned the flames further, and pleas for JDC's humanitarian intervention increased. Consequently, the Soviet Union allowed the JDC to work with the American Relief Aid (ARA), instead of the Jewish Public Committee, in order to help those living in famine. This went on from 1921 to 1923, and during this time the JDC and ARA were able to use nearly $4 million to feed 2 million people in both Belarus and Ukraine.

The JDC went further to improve conditions for the Jews living in Ukraine by bringing 86 tractors from America to Ukraine. They used these tractors to help reconstruct Jewish agricultural colonies. Many of these colonies in which Jews were living had been destroyed during the war, and were not of optimal living conditions. Furthermore, Dr Joseph A. Rosen, the director of the Russian branch of the JDC, devised a plan to further assist Jews living in shtetls, Jewish towns where the majority of the population speaks Yiddish.

The communist leadership outlawed businesses upon which Jews were largely dependent, forcing families into poverty. All of these acts lead the creation of the American Jewish Joint Agricultural Corporation (Agro-Joint) in 1924. JDC appointed a New York lawyer, James N. Rosenberg, to head its European Executive Council and oversee Agro-Joint operations. He was later named President of the American Society for Jewish Farm Settlements in Russia, Inc.

One innovation was the establishment of loan kassas, cooperative credit institutions that issued low interest loans to Jewish craftsmen and small business owners. The capital from kassa loans helped revitalize villages and towns throughout Eastern Europe between 1924 until 1938.

With the support of the Soviet government, JDC pushed forward an initiative to settle so-called "nonproductive" Jews as farmers on vast agricultural settlements in Ukraine, Crimea, and Belarus, as well as an attempt to grant Jewish autonomy in Crimea. A special public organization, the Society for Settling Toiling Jews on the Land, or OZET, was established in the Soviet Union for this purpose, and functioned from 1925 to 1938. There was also a special government committee createdp, called Komzet, whose function was to contribute and distribute the land for the Jewish collective farms, and to work jointly with OZET. The United States delivered updated agricultural equipment to the Jewish colonies in the USSR. The JDC also had agronomists teach the Jewish colonists how to do agricultural work. This helped over 150,00 Jews and improved over 250 settlements. The number of Jewish peasants was greatly reduced because unemployment was down and the colonies were more successful.

Agro-Joint was also active, during these years, in helping with the resettlement of refugee Jewish doctors from Germany.

The success of the Agro-Joint initiative would turn tragic just two years later. Joseph Stalin's government had grown increasingly hostile to foreign organizations. Agro-Joint workers soon became targets of the Great Purge under the mass operations of the NKVD. Operational Order No. 00439, entitled "On the Arrest of German Subjects Suspected of Espionage against the USSR" was issued on July 25, 1937, and mandated the arrest of current and former German citizens who had taken up Soviet citizenship. Later in the year, the order was expanded to include others suspected of collaborating or spying for Germany. Agro-Joint workers, and the doctors it had helped to resettle, became targets. Many of those who assisted in Agro-Joint, including its 17 staff, were arrested and accused of espionage and counterrevolutionary activities, and were killed.

All of the settlers who had not already fled were killed by the Nazis in 1941.

=== Great Depression ===
When the Great Depression began, most American citizens began to face a financial hardship, and the JDC felt the effects. Funding began to dry up, as people had a hard time donating money to the organization. Due to their lessened resources, the JDC focused its efforts on the Jews who remained in Germany. In addition to their financial difficulties, Nazis pillaged the JDC European headquarters, which caused them to move their headquarters from Berlin to Paris. Despite the continuing depression in America, American Jews began to donate more money to the JDC as they became more aware of the grave situation and danger that their fellow Jews were in. While America was in the Great Depression, the JDC was able to aid over 190,000 Jews in their escape from Nazi Germany, and 80,000 able to escape Europe completely.

=== Before World War II ===
Hitler's rise to power in 1933 was followed closely by passage of Germany's Nuremberg Laws, a set of onerous restrictions that stripped Jews of their basic human rights and livelihoods. JDC's support became critical to the survival of the Jews. Channeling funds through local Jewish relief organizations, JDC subsidized medical care, schools, vocational training, welfare programs, and early emigration efforts. JDC support would eventually be extended to Jewish communities in Nazi-annexed Austria and occupied Czechoslovakia. It was not long before the escalation of Hitler's persecution of the Jews made emigration aid from the JDC a priority. JDC provided emergency aid for stranded refugees, covered travel expenses and landing fees, and secured travel accommodations and travel visas for countries of refuge.

When Germany invaded Poland on September 1, 1939, starting World War II, there was an increased need to help Jewish emigration. From 1933 to 1939, JDC-supported organizations helped 110,000 Jews emigrate from Germany, 30,000 in 1939 alone.

The Évian Conference was organized in 1938 to find solutions to the growing Jewish refugee crisis in Nazi Germany. The Dominican Republic, led by Rafael Trujillo agreed to accept 100,000 refugees, the only country of 32 attending the conference willing to increase their immigration limits. The Dominican Republic Settlement Association, or DORSA, a project of the JDC, was initiated to resettle Jewish refugees from Europe into an agricultural settlement in Sosúa, Dominican Republic. Leon Falk Jr. served as president of the association from 1941 to 1942. The first group of refugees arrived at the 26,000 acre colony in Sosúa Bay on May 11, 1940. An additional 300 refugees had immigrated to the colony by January 1941. Falk Jr and his wife Katherine were very active in the association, including sponsoring some of the trips, arranging grants from the Falk Foundation and visiting the colony several times.

The JDC was still able to help refugees in transit in more than 40 countries in 1940. The Joint opened shelters and soup kitchens for thousands of Jewish refugees in Poland, aiding 600,000 in 1940. It also subsidized hospitals, child care centers, and educational and cultural programs. Even Passover supplies were shipped in. The goal of this was to provide refugees life-sustaining aid while trying to secure permanent refuge for them in the United States, Israel, and Latin America.

With U.S. entry into the war following the attack on Pearl Harbor, JDC had to drastically shift gears. No longer permitted to operate legally in enemy countries, JDC representatives exploited a variety of international connections to channel aid to Jews living in desperate conditions in Nazi-controlled areas. Wartime headquarters were set up in neutral Lisbon, Portugal.

From Lisbon, JDC chartered ships and funded rescue missions that successfully moved thousands of refugees out of harm's way. Some made it to Shanghai, China, where JDC sponsored a relief program for 15,000 refugees from Central and Eastern Europe. In Europe, JDC directed funds to support 7,000 Jewish children in hiding. The Joint also worked with Œuvre de secours aux enfants (OSE) to support and rescue children, helping more than 1,000 children emigrate to Switzerland and Spain. Other children fled to America, with help from the Joint and other organizations, such as the Hebrew Immigrant Aid Society. Many of those children who were able to make it to America came without parents, making them part of the "One Thousand Children" (OTC).

=== MS St. Louis ===
The ocean liner MS St. Louis left Germany on May 13, 1939 and headed to Havana, Cuba. On the ship, there were 937 passengers, most of which were Jews fleeing Nazi-occupied Germany. Nearly all the Jewish passengers had applied for U.S. visas and planned to stay in Cuba only until they obtained their visas. However, the Cuban government "revoked" the Cuban visas, and only granted entry to Cuba to 28 of the 937 passengers. And then, the U.S. refused to provide entry visas to America.

Once this news reached Europe and the United States, an attorney, Lawrence Berenson, who worked with the Jewish Joint Distribution Committee decided to intervene on behalf of the passengers being denied entry to Cuba. During this time, the JDC was striving to help Jewish immigrants find a home, so the goal of Berenson was to help these passengers. Berenson met and negotiated with Cuban President Federico Laredo Brú, however, the negotiations were unsuccessful. Brú demanded the St. Louis leave Cuban waters on June 2. The ship sailed close to the Florida border, and asked President Franklin Roosevelt to grant them access into the United States, but they never received a response. The ship returned to Europe and the JDC continued to negotiate on behalf of the passengers. Morris C. Troper as well as other individuals of the JDC appealed to European governments to secure entry visas for those with nowhere to go.

Due to the efforts of the JDC, 288 passengers were admitted to the United Kingdom, 181 to the Netherlands, 214 to Belgium, and 224 to France. When the Nazis overran the Netherlands, Belgium, Luxembourg, and France, those passengers who had been admitted by those countries were at risk. A total of 254 of these St. Louis passengers were killed in the Holocaust. Due to the JDC active efforts and connections, JDC was able to save most of the Jewish passengers aboard the St. Louis.

=== The Holocaust ===
During the Holocaust, the American Jewish Joint Distribution Committee was the main financial benefactor towards Jewish emigration from Europe and rescue attempts of Jews from Nazi-controlled territories. From the outbreak of World War II through 1944, JDC made it possible for more than 81,000 Jews to emigrate out of Nazi-occupied Europe to safety. JDC also smuggled aid to Jewish prisoners in labor camps and helped finance the Polish Jewish underground in preparations for the 1943 Warsaw Ghetto Uprising. In addition, JDC was a major channel keeping American Jewish leaders informed—often in detail—about the holocaust.

=== Post World War II ===
Allied victory offered no guarantee that the tens of thousands of newly liberated Jews (Sh'erit ha-Pletah) would survive to enjoy the fruits of freedom. To stave off mass starvation, JDC marshaled its resources, instituting an ambitious purchasing and shipping program to provide urgent necessities for Holocaust survivors facing critical local shortages. More than 227 million pounds of food, medicine, clothing, and other supplies were shipped to Europe from U.S. ports.

Hastily set up displaced person camps throughout Germany, Austria, and Italy took in 75,000 Jewish survivors of the Nazi horrors by 1945, but conditions were abominable. Earl G. Harrison, dean of the University of Pennsylvania Law School, asked Joseph Schwartz, JDC's European director, to accompany him on his official tour of the camps. His landmark report called for separate Jewish camps and for United Nations Relief and Rehabilitation Administration (UNRRA) participation in administering them, with JDC's help. In response, Schwartz virtually re-created JDC, putting together a field organization that covered Europe and later North Africa and designing a more proactive operational strategy.

Supplementing the relief supplied by the army, UNRRA, and its successor agency, the International Refugee Organization, JDC distributed emergency aid. It also fed the educational and cultural needs of the displaced, providing typewriters, books, Torah scrolls, ritual articles, and holiday provisions. JDC funds were directed at restoring a sense of community and normalcy in the camps with new medical facilities, schools, synagogues, and cultural activities. Over the next two years, the influx of refugees from all over Central and Eastern Europe would more than triple the number of Jews in the camps. Their number included Polish Jews who had returned from their wartime refuge in the Soviet Union only to flee once again (westward, this time) from renewed anti-Semitism and pogroms.

During the immediate post-war period, the JDC also worked closely with organizations focused on Jewish cultural property (much of it heirless), such as the Jewish Cultural Reconstruction and the Jewish Restitution Successor Organization.

At the same time, JDC was helping sustain tens of thousands of Jews who remained in Eastern Europe, as well as thousands of others living in the West outside the DP camps in Jewish communities also receiving reconstruction assistance from JDC. An estimated 120,000 Jews in Hungary, 65,000 in Poland, and more than half of Romania's 380,000 Jews, depended on JDC for food and other basic needs in 1946. The JDC was supporting 380 medical facilities across the continent, and some 137,000 Jewish children were receiving some form of JDC aid by 1947. Falling victim to Cold War tensions, JDC was expelled from Romania, Poland, and Bulgaria in 1949, from Czechoslovakia in 1950, and from Hungary in 1953.

=== Early Israel ===
The time came for JDC to shift its focus in Europe from emergency relief to long-term rehabilitation. A large part of its evolving mission involved preparing the Jewish refugee population for new lives in the soon to be the Jewish state of Israel. Vocational training and hachsharot (agricultural training) centers were established for this purpose.

The goal of resettlement carried its own hurdles. Since before the war, Palestine had been under control of the British Mandatory Palestine, which severely restricted the immigration of Europe's Jewish refugees. Clandestine immigration went on in spite of the blockades, largely because of the work of Bricha and Aliyah Bet, two organized movements partially financed and supplied by JDC. When the British began interning illegal Jewish immigrants in detention camps in Cyprus, JDC furnished medical, educational, and social services for the detainees.

Britain's eventual withdrawal set the stage for the May 15, 1948 Israeli Declaration of Independence, which quickly drew waves of Jews not only from Europe, but from across the Arab world. North Africa became an especially dangerous place for Jews following World War II, with Jews in Libya suffering a devastating pogrom in 1945.

The 1948 Arab–Israeli War set off a wave of nationalist fervor in the region, leading to anti-Jewish riots in the Aden Protectorate, Morocco, and Tripoli, Libya. Nearly the entire Jewish population of Libya, 31,000 persons, immigrated to Israel within a few years. The JDC and Israel organized Operation Magic Carpet, the June 1948 airlift of 50,000 Yemenite Jews to Israel. In all, more than 300,000 Jews left North Africa for Israel. Thousands more Iraqi and Kurdish Jews were transported through Operation Ezra, also funded by JDC, after the Farhud.

The influx was so massive, and the capacity of the newborn nation to provide for its burgeoning citizenry so limited, that the dream of statehood could have died before it had taken root. Among the new arrivals were 100,000 veterans of Europe's displaced persons camps, less than half able-bodied adults. The remainder included the aged, sick, or disabled survivors of concentration camps. Tuberculosis was rampant.

The Israeli government in late 1949 invited JDC to join with the Jewish Agency for Israel to confront these challenges, leading to the creation of MALBEN (Hebrew: Organization for the Care of Handicapped Immigrants). Over the next few years, MALBEN rushed to convert former British Army barracks and any other available building into hundreds of hospitals, homes for the aged, tuberculosis sanatoriums, sheltered workshops, and rehabilitation centers. MALBEN also funded the training of nurses and rehabilitation workers.

JDC assumed full responsibility for MALBEN in 1951. Its many rehabilitation programs opened new worlds to the disadvantaged, enabling them to contribute to the building of the new country. At the same time, Israel's local and national government agencies were building capacity. With the need for emergency aid receding, by the end of the decade, JDC developed more long-term community-based programs aimed at Israel's most vulnerable citizens. In the coming years, JDC would become a social catalyst by encouraging and guiding collaborations between the Israeli government and private agencies to identify, evaluate, and address unmet needs in Israeli society.

=== Social welfare ===
JDC helped Israel develop social welfare methods and policy, with many of its programs having served as models for government and non-governmental agencies around the world. Institutional care for the aged was replaced whenever practicable with initiatives that enabled older people to live at home in their communities. The Ministry of Health was established in collaboration with the Psychiatric Trust Fund to develop modern, integrated mental health services and to train qualified staff. The Paul Baerwald School of Social Work and Social Welfare, first created by JDC in France to train professionals working with refugees from many diverse cultures, was reestablished at the Hebrew University of Jerusalem to professionalize social services.

JDC's social work innovations continued into the 1960s with the founding of Israel's first Child Development and Assessment Center, which put into practice the new idea that early detection and treatment optimized outcomes for children with disabilities. Following that success, Child Development Centers soon spread across the country.

JDC during this period also worked closely with Israeli voluntary agencies that served children with physical and mental disabilities, helping them set up therapy programs, kindergartens, day centers, counseling services for parents, and Jewish summer camps. It also advised these organizations on fundraising strategies to help them become financially independent.

JDC and the government of Israel inaugurated ESHEL, the Association for the Planning and Development of Services for the Aged, in 1969 to extend a network of coordinated local, regional, and national services to underserved elderly. Still active today, ESHEL is credited with improving the quality of life of Israel's seniors.

With these and other like-minded projects, JDC underwent an important transition with regard to its role in Israel. Initially engaged by the government to provide emergency aid to a traumatized and impoverished population of former refugees, JDC had redirected its efforts toward advising and subsidizing a broad spectrum of community based public and volunteer service providers. The evolution was a reflection of a new reality: Israel had come into its own as a nation and had successfully achieved an infrastructure with the capacity to address the needs of its most vulnerable citizens. JDC had transferred its MALBEN facilities to the government by the end of 1975 and divested itself of all direct services.

=== Diaspora work ===
The 1980s and 1990s saw JDC expand both its reach and the scope of its mission. Under the banner of "Rescue, Relief, and Renewal," the organization responded to the challenges that faced Jewish communities around the world, its emphasis on building the capacity of local partners to be self-sustaining.

The thawing of the Cold War and subsequent break up of the Soviet Union yielded a formal invitation from Mikhail Gorbachev for JDC's return to the region in 1989; 50 years after Joseph Stalin brutally expelled the organization, killing several JDC members in the process. The former Soviet Union and its largely isolated and destitute community of elderly Jewish populations quickly became (and remain) the organization's priority. A growing network of Heseds that JDC helped establish in local communities provided welfare assistance to a peak caseload of 250,000 elderly Jews.

According to a JDC publication, "The first Hesed Center was established in 1993 in St. Petersburg by Dr. Amos Avgar of the AJJDC." Dr. Avgar began developing the Hesed Model in 1992 while leading a work of experts who sought to create "a multi-functional service model." It was Avgar who set the foundations of the Hesed Model that operates according to three main principles: Jewish values, community orientation, and volunteerism. Hesed Centers have left a profound impact on both Jewish communities and on non-Jewish circles in the FSU. To publicly and formally acknowledge this impact, the Russian Academy of Languages added in March 2000 the Hebrew word "Hesed" (хесед) to the Russian language. Today, the Hesed Community Welfare Centers is still serving 168,000 of the world's poorest Jews in the former Soviet Union (December 2008).

JDC has also been instrumental in the rescue of Jews fleeing famine, violence, and other dangers around the world. The saga of Ethiopia's Jews was perhaps the most dramatic, culminating in Operation Solomon, the massive 36-hour airlift of 14,000 Jews from Addis Ababa to Israel on May 24 and 25, 1991, just as the city was about to come under rebel attack. JDC assisted in the negotiation and planning of that rescue effort, which came on the heels of the comprehensive health and welfare program it had been operating for the thousands of Jews who had gathered in Addis Ababa in preparation for the departure.

Equally compelling were the 11 rescue convoys that JDC operated from war-ravaged Sarajevo during the 1992-95 war in Bosnia and Herzegovina. The convoys succeeded in transporting 2,300 Serbs, Croats, Bosniaks, and Jews to safety in other parts of the former Yugoslavia and beyond. JDC also supported the Sarajevo Jewish community's non-sectarian relief efforts in that besieged city, and helped the Belgrade community assist the many Jews affected by Serbia's economic difficulties as UN-mandated trade sanctions took a growing toll.

Wherever JDC has become active, emergency aid has gone hand-in-hand with local institution-building for the long term. In India, home to the Bene Israel community, JDC in the 1960s channeled funding to the rehabilitation of local schools and included support for food programs and capital upgrades. It also helped underwrite tuition for teachers and student leaders to study in Israel. In Latin America, where Jews fleeing the Nazis had settled decades earlier, often with JDC's assistance, the organization in the late '80s created Leatid, a program that trains local lay and professional Jewish leaders to ensure that communities are self-sustaining.

The formalization of JDC's non-sectarian work under its International Development Program in 1986 marked another milestone. While JDC had always offered assistance to non-Jews in crisis since the organization's founding in 1914, the formation of the new program was done to ensure a unified Jewish response to global disasters, both natural and manmade, on behalf of U.S. and foreign Jewish agencies. Since then, JDC relief and recovery efforts have assisted tens of thousands of people left vulnerable in the wake of the mid-90s civil war in Rwanda, the Kosovo refugee crisis, the devastating 1999 earthquake in Turkey, and the 2004 tsunami in South Asia. As in its Jewish-specific projects, JDC's non-sectarian work includes both emergency management and the building of local institutional capacity to ensure that people at risk continue to be served long after the disaster has passed.

== 21st Century operations ==
JDC has operated in 85 countries at one time or another in the course of its 100-year history. They are conducting projects in 71 countries, including Argentina, Croatia, Ethiopia, Poland, Morocco, Cuba, and throughout the former Soviet Union, as of 2009. JDC also maintains a focus on Israel and has been a humanitarian presence in the Middle East since its founding in 1914.

=== JDC Entwine ===
JDC Entwine, the young adult leadership platform of JDC, was launched in 2007 under the name JDC Next Gen, with the goal of empowering young Jewish leaders to continue JDC's legacy. According to their website, "Entwine is a one-of-a-kind movement for young Jewish leaders, influencers, and advocates who seek to make a meaningful impact on global Jewish needs and international humanitarian issues."

Entwine engages Jewish young professionals and college students through its annual series of overseas immersive experiences (Insider Trips), Multi-Week Services Corps, and year-long Jewish Service Corps Fellowship (JSC).

=== Partners ===
JDC partners with local organizations in creating and implementing all JDC projects that are culturally sensitive and organic worldwide. These partnerships enable JDC to most effectively address the unique needs of the communities where it operates and to build the capacity of all of the institutions, professionals, and volunteers so they become equipped with the skills needed to serve their own communities.

=== Programs and priorities ===
Relief, Rescue, Renewal –Aiding Jewry Worldwide is JDC's mission to alleviate suffering and enhance the lives of Jews has taken it across geographic, cultural, and political borders on five continents. Currently, the regions drawing the greatest amount of JDC effort include the following:

- The Former Soviet Union. The upheaval caused by the breakup of the Soviet Union in 1991 brought both crisis and opportunity to Jews living there. All religions and minorities suffered under communism, and so fractured communities of Jews were suddenly confronted with a collapsed infrastructure and an uncertain future, but also the hope that it might now be possible to assert and reclaim a heritage long denied them. JDC, which had only recently begun to reestablish a presence in the region after being violently expelled by Stalin in 1938, poured its resources into the relief, rescue, and restoration of Jewish populations fighting for survival. Today, JDC provides food, medical care, home care, and winter relief to 168,000 elderly Jews, largely through 175 Hesed welfare centers throughout the region. JDC also provides nutritional, medical, and other assistance to 25,000 children at risk and their families. In addition to life-sustaining aid, JDC helps Jews reclaim their heritage and build vibrant self-sustaining Jewish communities through Jewish Community Centers, libraries, Hillel youth centers, family retreats, Jewish education, and local leadership development.
- Central and Eastern Europe. As in the former Soviet Union, social and economic shifts threaten the stability of the many diverse Jewish communities throughout Central and Eastern Europe and the Baltic countries. JDC's social welfare and community development approaches are as varied as the communities they assist. JDC relief programs for Holocaust survivors reach 26,000 elderly, while the organization works with local partners to ensure that impoverished children's basic needs are met. The overarching goal is self-sustainability and shifting welfare responsibilities to local entities. To achieve this, JDC provides consultation to communities in the areas of leadership training, strategic planning, fundraising, property management, and networking, helping local professionals to develop the skills to serve the larger community.
- Africa and Asia. It terms of sheer numbers, Jewish communities in Africa and the Far East range from sizable (upwards of 14,000 in Turkey) to small (Algeria is home to only a handful of Jews, because of the Islamist governments of the 1990s). Jewish populations on both continents are diminishing, either through emigration or because the elderly are all that remain. But wherever there is a Jew and a desire to maintain the trappings and traditions of Jewish life, JDC strives to ensure that basic needs are met and Jewish institutions continue. JDC supports local Jewish education and training efforts and puts special emphasis on international programs that bridge isolated Jewish populations with Jews all over the world.
- The Americas. There are nearly a quarter million Jews in Argentina, more than in any other nation in the Western hemisphere after the United States. That number includes a vibrant, emerging middle class. But much of that progress was thrown in turmoil by a nationwide financial crisis in 2001 that plunged thousands into economic despair and entrenched the pull of poverty for those already living in it. JDC responded, providing critical assistance to 36,000 Argentine Jews. Since then, JDC has begun to cede its assistance role to its local partners while continuing to ensure that basic food and medical needs of the most vulnerable citizens are met.
- Israel. JDC's relationship with Israel is unique. While the organization works with the cooperation of the governments of other nations where it has a presence, with Israel the relationship is more of a direct partnership. Working together, JDC and the Israeli government strengthen the capacity of local agencies to address the immediate and long-term needs of the elderly, at-risk youth, the chronically under employed, and new immigrants. JDC assists in building and maintaining Israel's social strengths—including management of the public sector, governance and management of nonprofit organizations, volunteerism, and philanthropy—so that the society as a whole is more able to meet its own needs. JDC also helps those Jews and non-Jews living under fire in southern Israel.

== JDC Israel ==
In 1976, JDC Global established JDC Israel (also known as "The Joint", הג'וינט) with its headquarters in Jerusalem. Since then, JDC Israel has been developing programs and services for Israel's most vulnerable populations through its partnerships with the Israeli government, associations and non-profit organizations. JDC Israel operates through several departments:

- ASHALIM – Advancing Social Mobility
- ELKA – System Efficiency and Effectiveness
- ESHEL – Optimal Aging
- Israel Unlimited – Independent Living for People with Disabilities
- TEVET – Workforce Integration and Productivity

== Institutions ==
In the course of its history, JDC has helped create many institutions that do research and policy development that inform JDC programs and advance its goals.

=== Public policy making ===
The Myers-JDC-Brookdale Institute, a partnership between the JDC, the Government of Israel, and the David and Inez Myers Foundation, was established in 1974. Its role is to conduct applied social research on the scope and causes of social needs, specifically those related to aging, health policy, children and youth, people with disabilities, employment, and quality in the social services, and assesses various approaches to addressing them. The information produced by researchers has proven a powerful tool for Israel's policy makers and social service practitioners. Among other examples, MJB researchers:

- Revealed the dramatic increase in the number of Israel's disabled elderly and helped develop strategies to expand community services for them.
- Helped to expand and improve national education policy for Ethiopian children in the 1990s, which resulted in improved high school achievements and greater participation in higher education.
- Facilitated the implementation of Israel's Special Education Law, which markedly expanded services for disabled children in the 1990s.
- Helped to introduce and effectively implement the National Health Insurance Law (1995), which provides universal and more equitable coverage to all of Israel's citizens.

Other JDC-affiliated institutions include The Taub Center for Social Policy Studies in Israel, an independent think tank that analyzes and develops social policy alternatives, and the recently established JDC International Centre for Community Development, which supports JDC's efforts worldwide to enhance and support Jewish communal life.

=== Training ===
Leadership training is a JDC core value. To that end, JDC founded Leatid, the European center for Jewish leadership. The Leatid training program, with its focus on management and community planning, helps expand the pool of outstanding professional Jewish men and women committed to the continued well being of their communities. Jewish leaders from all parts of Europe have taken part in Leatid training seminars, including most of the current presidents of European Jewish communities, executive directors, key board members and rabbis. Indeed, those leaders who aren't Leatid alumnus almost certainly underwent Buncher Community Leadership Training, another JDC effort in partnership with the Buncher Family Foundation and the United Jewish Federation of Pittsburgh. Since its start in 1989, Buncher Leadership Training has conducted seminars in the former Soviet Union, the Baltic States, Poland, Germany, Former Yugoslavia, Romania, Hungary, and Bulgaria as well as India and Latin America.

Finally, the Moscow NGO Management School, founded by JDC in 2005, effectively strengthens the Russian nonprofit sector by providing professional training to managers of nonprofit organizations. The curriculum is crafted to provide opportunities for nonprofit leaders to gain skills to help their organizations succeed.

=== Disaster relief ===
Working with local partners, JDC has provided emergency aid and long-term development assistance to communities devastated by such catastrophic events as the Kashmir earthquake in 2005, and the South Asia tsunami in 2004. More recent relief efforts include:

- 2008 Ziarat earthquake: JDC collected funds to directly assist victims of the quake and partnered with the International Blue Crescent to deliver much-need food, bedding, hygiene kits, and warm clothing to those hardest hit.
- 2008 South Ossetia war: JDC partnered with the Georgian Red Cross and MASHAV, the Center for International Development of Israel's Ministry of Foreign Affairs, to coordinate the shipment and deployment of critical medical supplies and other emergency assistance. JDC continues to assess the needs of the region and develop a strategy for long-term assistance to those displaced by the conflict.
- 2008 Sichuan earthquake: JDC is supporting a partnership between The All China Federation of Supply and Marketing Cooperatives (ACFSMC) and the Negev Institute for Strategies of Peace and Development (NISPED) that is leading an ambitious reconstruction effort in the region.
- Cyclone Nargis: JDC was among the only aid organizations to enter Myanmar's Irrawaddy Delta, and coordinated with other nongovernmental organizations to immediately provide water, food, and medical supplies and is now supporting efforts to rebuild schools, homes, and embankments destroyed by the cyclone.
- April 2015 Nepal earthquake: JDC is looking to leverage its expert disaster response team and coordinate with the local authorities in order to assess the situation and provide for survivors' needs. They are aiming to bring medical supplies, distribute shelter supplies, food kits and oral rehydration salts as well as address the needs of children, providing them with shelter, water and nutrition.

== See also ==
- Tzedakah
- Jewish refugees
- United Jewish Appeal
