= Avi Schönfeld =

Polish pianist and composer

Avi Schönfeld is a Polish pianist and composer. He was born in Lodz, Poland on 15 December 1947.

== Life ==
Schönfeld gave his first concert in his native Poland at the age of 19 before going to Israel to become a pupil of the Bartók disciple Ilona Vincze-Kraus. After winning several national and international prizes, including one with the Jerusalem Symphony Orchestra and first prize in the Leo Kestenberg competition, Schönfeld made his debut in 1968 with the Israeli Radio and Television Orchestra playing Rachmaninov's Paganini Variations.

In November 1972, at the invitation of the French government, Schönfeld undertook study with Vlado Perlemuter, Yvonne Lefébure, Arthur Rubinstein, and Marcel Ciampi in piano, Henryk Szeryng in chamber music, and Nadia Boulanger and Alexandre Tansman in composition. After a period of teaching at the Royal Brussels Conservatory, Schönfeld was appointed to a post at the Maastricht Conservatory in the Netherlands.

In addition to his creative work, Schönfeld is artistic director and founder of the European Pianistic Research Institute of Maastricht (EPRIM) and artistic adviser to the Anglo Dutch Piano Platform and the Académie Pianistica of the Maastricht Municipal Theatre. He receives commissions for writing the compositions for piano competitions and serves as a jury member in said competitions.

== Compositions ==
Schönfeld’s piano catalogue includes Animato, Sphinx, Labyrinthe, Ombres, Sentiers No. 1 (written for the Indonesian pianist Ananda Sukarlan) and Tango-Étude (Max Eschig/Durand), Agitato and Jeu (Henry Lemoine), Légende (Éditions Combre) and Sonatine Méditerranéenne, alongside five piano sonatas (No. 3 Notturno, No. 4 Hommage à Chopin, No. 5 in C minor). Chamber works include a violin sonata and Ballade for violin and piano, a cello sonata, a clarinet sonata, a suite for two pianos, and a piano concerto.

Reviews describe his idiom as balancing modernist rigor with accessible chromatic tonality: “a compromise between the rigorously disciplined dissonance of the Second Viennese School and the simpler chromatic tonality of Barber,” with phrasing shaped like declamation and an emphasis on varied gesture and sonority. The piano writing is noted for fluency and playability despite high energy and virtuosity.

== Teaching ==
Schönfeld’s piano teaching combined technical discipline with physical freedom, emphasizing coordination between hand, arm, and finger for clarity, rhythm, and tone control. Central to his approach was the refined use of the fingers — notably controlled finger lifting and what he described as the umbrella technique, linking natural finger action to strategic arm movement. Drawing on the traditions of Ilona Vincze-Krausz, Yvonne Lefébure, Vlado Perlemuter, and Arthur Rubinstein, he encouraged a search for sonority and color, teaching that phrasing, rhythm, and tonal shading were inseparable aspects of musical interpretation. Former students recall his lessons as analytical yet artistic, always aimed at uniting technique and sound.
