= Hesed (organization) =

Nonprofit organization

Hesed (FSU Jewish Community Welfare Centers)
- Formation: 1993
- Founder: Amos Avgar
- Type: Charity
- Location: Post-Soviet states

Hesed is a network of nonprofit community welfare centers to serve the Jewish community in former Soviet Union states (FSU's). The network provides services to Jews who remained in post-Soviet states after the dissolution of the Soviet Union. Hesed uses its volunteers and charity centers to provide basic necessities and medical services within a physical location in which community members can meet and participate in cultural and religious activities.

== History ==
The first Hesed center opened in 1993 in St. Petersburg. The organization was formed by the American Jewish Joint Distribution Committee (JDC) and funded by JDC, International Fellowship of Christians and Jews (IFCJ), World Jewish Relief, and other donors. Hesed based its structure and activities on a model developed by Amos Avgar, who was Director of the JDC-FSU Welfare Department. Volunteering, fostering community and Jewish traditions or Yiddishkeit were central to the model. As of 2003, there were 174 Hesed centers operating in 2,800 Jewish communities and serving over a quarter-million people in the FSU. Hesed continued to operate through the war between Russia and Ukraine in Crimea and the Donbas starting in 2014. During the 2022 Russian invasion of Ukraine, Hesed continued providing services to its approximately 37,000 Ukrainian clients. The organization also offered psychological counseling and operated a hotline for those needing assistance and treatment during the hostilities.

== Services ==
In addition to activities in the Hesed centers, volunteers visit the homebound. Hesed's services included food programs and packages, meals-on-wheels, soup kitchens, winter relief, homecare, providing medicine, medical equipment and medical services.

Social and community services include day centers, library services, and Jewish holiday celebrations.
