= Carter Larsen =

American classical pianist and composer

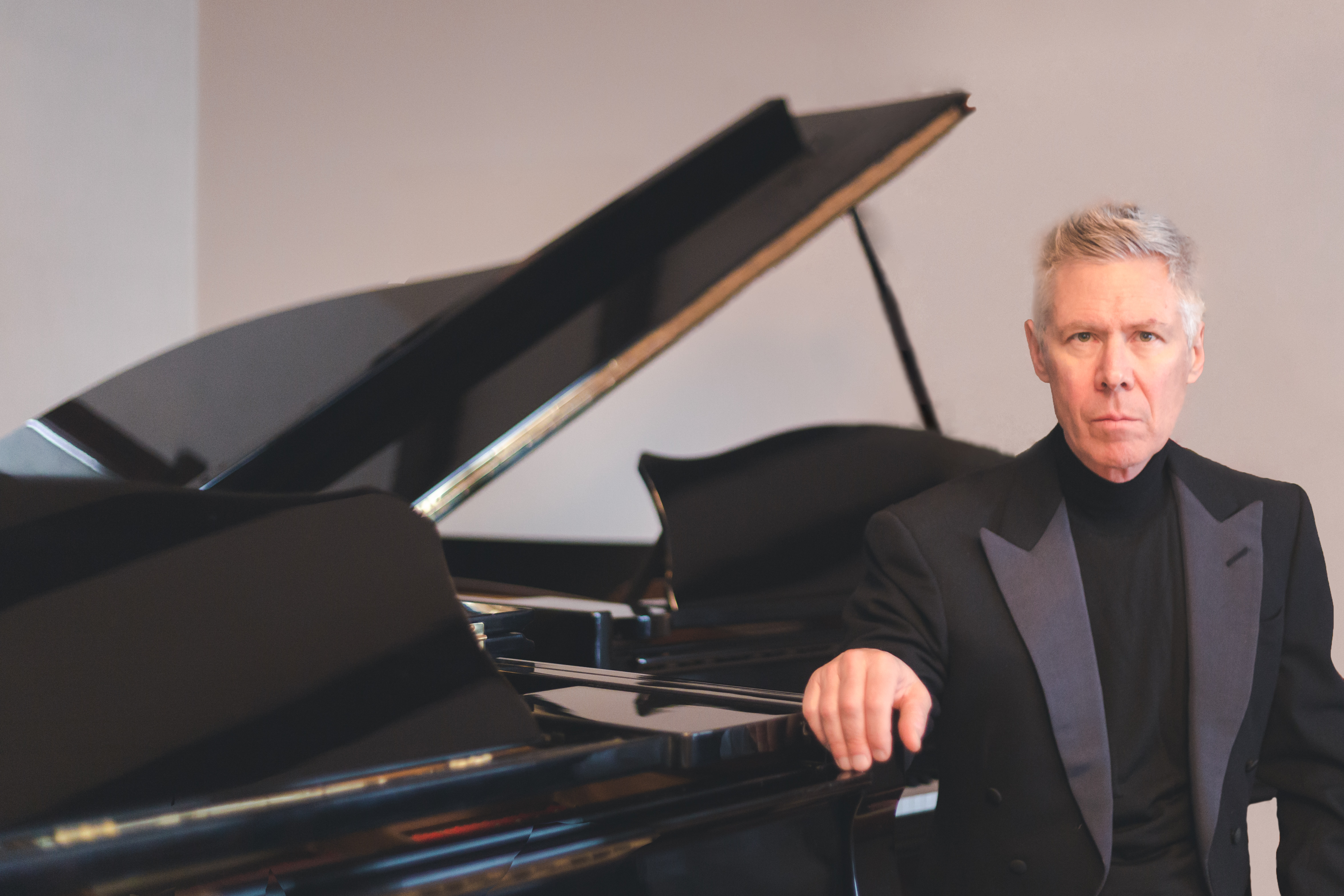
Carter Larsen

Carter Lawrence Larsen is an American classical pianist and composer, known mostly for his European performances in the 1980s. He focuses on piano and orchestra composition and has composed more than 600 pieces, including work for film scores.

== Early life and education ==
Larsen was born in San Francisco, California. He began piano studies at the age of six and started composing music in his teens. He graduated from the San Francisco Conservatory of Music and pursued a career as composer and pianist. He studied composition under John Adams and piano under Milton Salkind (Conservatory president) and Mack McCray. After studying at Conservatory, he worked with Peter Feuchtwanger and Ruth Nye in London, and Vlado Perlemuter in Paris.

== Musical style and compositions ==
Larsen is credited with having created a new style of 21st-century romanticism, which combined 19th-century romanticism with 20th century influences such as jazz, minimalism and world music. He is deemed a prolific composer, with more than 600 piano and orchestra works including Fantasia Suite, The Cosmos Symphonic Suite and Symphonies on The Lake to his name.

Andrea Van de Kamp, Chairman Emeritus of the Music Center in Los Angeles, said “Fantasia Suite" was "the music of the future." She described Larsen's 21st century, Neo-Romantic approach as a "breakthrough", and said he had embraced the best of classical culture while exploring other forms of creativity. Scott Epstein complimented Larsen's music, describing it as "personal, deeply felt and sophisticated", and said Larsen had resisted conventional labels and pursued his own path. Larsen's approach to the piano, though modern and individual, has been influential in the compositions of classical and romantic composers.

== Performances and appearances ==
Larsen became known in Europe for his piano performances of the High Romantics. His interpretations of Liszt, Grieg, Rachmaninoff and Saint-Saëns won acclaim from audiences and critics. He both conducted and performed as a soloist in major concerts with the Royal Philharmonic Orchestra and the London Symphony Orchestra. In 1986, his performance in London of Chopin's music was broadcast on BBC Television's "Omnibus " program. He performed several world premieres and recordings of previously unknown works of Liszt and Saint-Saëns. In 1989, he became the first pianist to make a complete CD recording of Saint-Saëns' solo piano music. He established himself as a composer, and premiered four original compositions alongside the classics, which were first broadcast in 1994 on the UK's Classic FM "Platform Live". He served as conductor in the 70th Academy Awards.

Larsen performed in China at the Shanghai Grand Theatre during Shanghai Expo 2010. At the closing night of the International Film Festival and the Shanghai Music Festival, he performed classics, original compositions and improvisations. The concert was covered by two television stations broadcasting to a total estimated audience of 500 million, and was the first time CNN had interviewed an artist for the Grand Theatre. The Shanghai International Channel and the Shanghai Arts Channel filmed a documentary of the concert.

== Larsen's Volumes ==
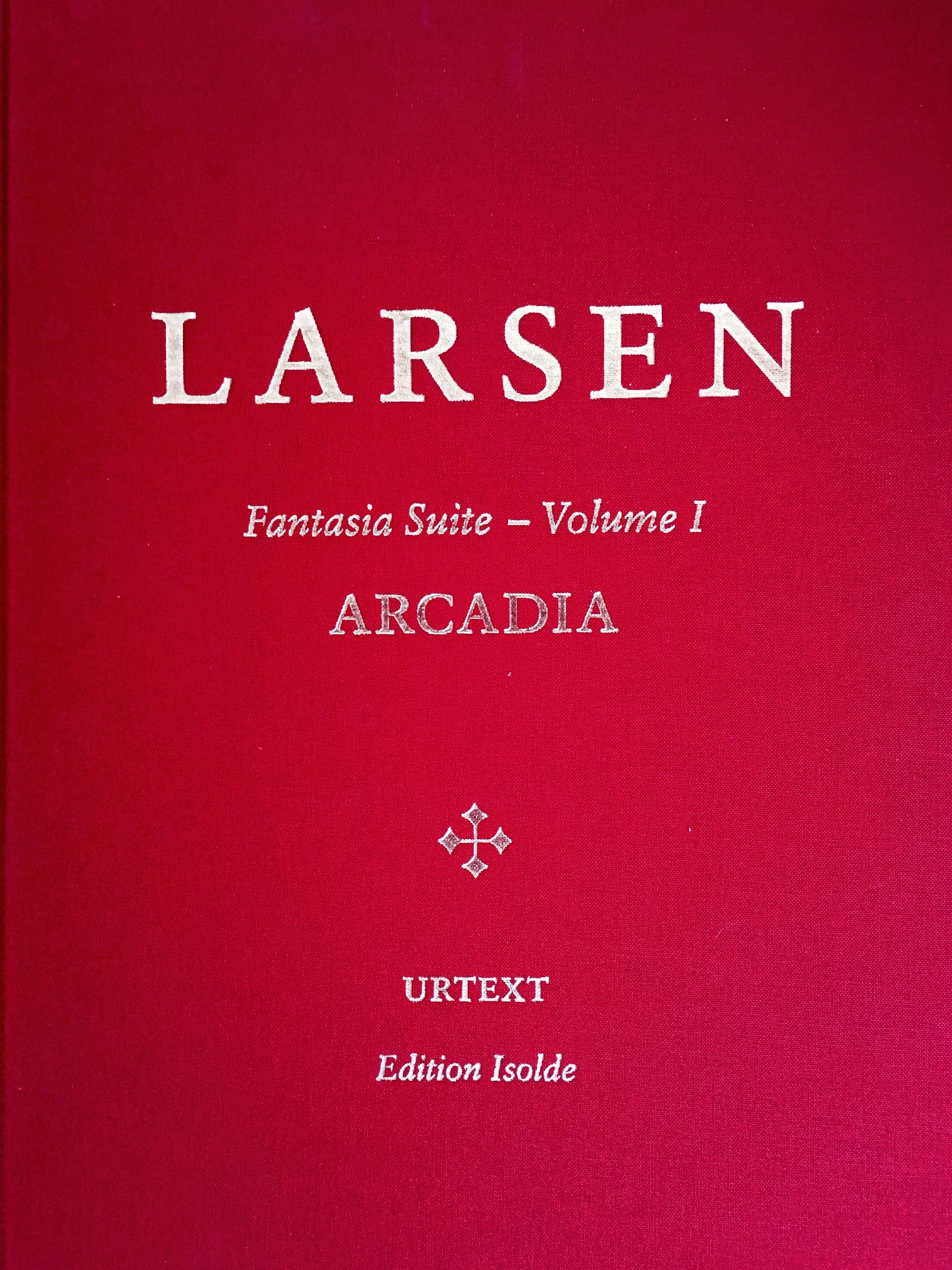
Volume 1 Arcadia

Since 1973, Larsen has written over 600 piano and orchestra works in Fantasia Suite and The Cosmos Symphonic Suite.

- Volume I – ARCADIA – Solo Piano
- Volume II – NEXUS – Solo Piano
- Volume III – EMERANCE – Solo Piano
- Volume IV – ODYSSEY – Solo Piano
- Volume V – KALIDA – Solo Piano
- Volume VI – ALTURAS – Solo Piano
- Volume VII – SENZI – Solo Piano for Kids
- Volume X – BRIDGES AND BEYOND – Piano and Orchestra
- Volume XI – LEGENDS OF THE COSMOS – Piano and Orchestra
- Volume XII – DIVINATION – Piano and Orchestra
- Volume XIII – FANTASIAS – Piano and Orchestra
- Volume Xa – BRIDGES AND BEYOND – Two Pianos
- Volume XIa – LEGENDS OF THE COSMOS – Two Pianos
- Volume XIIa – DIVINATION – Two Pianos
- Volume XIIIa – FANTASIAS – Two Pianos
- Volume XV – FAROS – Orchestra
- Volume XVI – REISCHEN – Orchestra
- Volume XVII – PARSCHADA – Orchestra
- Volume XVIII – VIAMALA – Orchestra
- Volume XIX – ZILLIS – Orchestra
- Volume XX – STARLERA – Orchestra
- Volume XXI – RHEINWALD – Orchestra
- Volume XXII – AVERS – Orchestra
- Volume XXIII – WERGENSTEIN – Orchestra
- Volume XXIV – CRESTA – Orchestra
- Volume XXV – MADRISCH – Orchestra
- Volume XXVI – BARENBURG – Orchestra
- Volume XXX – CIRCADIANCE – Instrumental

== Music in film ==
Larsen has written film and television scores, including music for major Hollywood studios. He composed music for various films, including Paramount's Star Trek, Nosferatu, Masterpiece Theatre, and The Mark of Zorro. Larsen's films "Innocents Mission" and Love Bytes premiered at the Sundance Film Festival, and his feature Big Shots premiered at the Cannes Film Festival.

== List of compositions ==
Fantasia Suite

- Arcadia
  - Flight, Op. 7
  - Reverence, Op. 36
  - Lumiere, Op. 28
  - Soliloquy, Op. 10
  - Bridges, Op. 3
  - Elegie, Op. 1
  - Brunella, Op. 22
  - Someday, Op. 2
  - Celebration, Op. 21
  - Spirit of Auriel, Op. 18
  - Seagulls of Capri, Op. 5
  - Gypsy’s Waltz, Op. 13
  - Carousel, Op. 25
  - Eternal Rhapsodie, Op. 4
- Nexus
  - Ethereal Nights, Op. 6
  - Innocence, Op. 17
  - Raging Light, Op. 33
  - Solstice, Op. 12
  - Circus Waltz, Op. 31
  - Dernier Voyage, Op. 37
  - Dragonfly, Op. 46
  - Moonlit Nostalgia, Op. 26
  - Spinato, Op. 68
  - Esprit, Op. 38
  - Lament, Op. 8
  - Mass Ascension Op. 9
- Emerance
  - Seacliff, Op. 27
  - Elysia, Op. 29
  - Cirrus, Op. 11
  - To the Wind, Op. 41
  - The Game, Op. 67
  - Leonora, Op. 42
  - Spectrum of Triumph, Op. 16
  - Dimanche, Op. 32
  - Mercurious, Op. 73
  - Santorini Op. 35
- Odyssey
  - Sirens in Trancoso Op. 62
  - Tale of Velasco Op. 72
  - Iris Op. 107
  - Call Of Asturias Op. 66
  - Realization Op. 63
  - Firestorm Op. 69
  - Prophecy Op. 49
  - Delphi Crystals Op. 79
  - Esaltante Op. 105
  - Euphoric Odyssey Op. 45
  - Reminiscence Op. 20
  - Ratanga Op. 61
  - The Gift Op. 14
  - Enrique’s Song Op. 59
  - Lance of Soleris Op. 95
  - March To The Cosmos Op. 44
- Kalida
  - Sapphire Op. 47
  - Reflect Op. 48
  - Amore E Destino Op. 34
  - Kai Op. 19
  - Folletta Op. 75
  - Spectre Op. 40
  - Valse Pensif Op. 51
  - Alexei’s Mission Op. 86
  - The Vision Op. 30
  - Scherzana Op. 52
  - Rainbow Op. 24
  - Mirage Op. 15
- Alturas
  - The Story of Glory Op. 126
  - Fate Op. 114
  - Fly with Me Op.127
  - Walls Of Troy Op. 14
  - Solemnity Op. 132
  - Celeste Op. 64
  - Passion Op. 118
  - Harp Whispers Op. 135
  - Resurrection Op. 122
  - Forest Mist Op. 124
  - Eternal Love Op. 140
  - Zampilli Op. 117
  - Azure Op. 98
  - Luna Romantica Op. 139
  - Danza Triste Op. 134
  - Sweet Sorrow Op. 121
  - Silence Of Love Op. 101
  - Dream Of Verona Op. 43
  - Fall River Op. 138
  - Innocence Op. 136
  - Full Sail Op. 148
  - Scarecrow Op. 149
  - Window to Kaja Op. 143
  - The Nomad Op. 142
  - Love At Sunset Op. 131
  - Lago Misterioso Op. 133
  - Land Of The Free Op. 130
  - Crystal Heart Op. 23
- Bridges and Beyond
  - Bridges Op. 148
  - Gipsy's Waltz Op. 149
  - Elegie Op. 150
  - Eternal Rhapsodie Op. 151
- Legends of the Cosmos
  - Lemuria Op. 152
  - Pyramids Of Atlantis Op. 153
  - The Gift Op. 154
  - Twilight Of Sitara Op. 155
- Divination
  - Spring Vision Op. 77
  - Transcendence Op. 78
  - The Maverick Op. 79
  - Dawn Of Freedom Op. 80
- Fantasias
  - Ethereal Nights Op. 156
  - Solstice Op. 157
  - Spectrums of Triumph Op. 158
- Labyrinth in the Stars
  - Emanation Op. 161
  - Utopia Illuminated Op. 162
  - Holograph Op. 163
  - Nemesis of the Spheres Op. 164
  - Golden Galaxy Op. 165

The Cosmos Symphonic Suite

- Faros
  - Artasia Op. 233
  - Heimdall’s Ruins Op. 227
  - Of Hope and Sorrow Op. 197
  - Circles Of Time Op. 173
  - Silent Gates Op. 210
  - Columns Of The Universe Op. 175
- Reischen
  - Rohllor Op. 198
  - Statues Of Dust Op. 223
  - Silver Wizard Op. 208
  - The Golden Cathedral Op. 217
  - Swords Of Fire Op. 222
- Parschada
  - Divinity And Phantasos Op. 199
  - The Sacret Stone Op. 220
  - Cosmic Juggler Op. 207
  - Ascension Op. 185
  - Gates Of Paradise Op. 228
- Viamala
  - Arcasius Op. 232
  - Terror Of Ragnus Op. 224
  - Angels and Death Op. 212
  - Twisted Velocity Op. 204
  - Call Of The Warriors Op. 181
- Zillis
  - Hillor Op. 203
  - Cristal Prophecy Op. 201
  - Volsina And The Harlequin Op. 215
  - Ephifany of Ersani Op. 205
  - Storms and Zephira Op. 174
- Starlera
  - Balderia Op. 192
  - The Secret Veil Op. 206
  - Freya And The Kaleidoscope Op. 182
  - The Hour Glass Op. 202
  - Angel Warriors Op. 184
- Rheinvald
  - Eyron Op. 172
  - Transmigration Op. 226
  - March Of The Kingdom Op. 186
  - Sky Whispers Op. 209
  - Archillusion Op. 231
  - Force Of Destiny Op. 191
- Avers
  - Thorus Op. 190
  - Wizard And The Spyglass Op. 193
  - Aurora Borealis Op. 211
  - Echos From The Galaxy Op. 176
  - View From Above Op. 179
- Wergenstein
  - Splendor Of Arasma Op. 213
  - Rainbow Messanger Op. 219
  - Astral Voices Op. 187
  - Celestial Jokers Op. 229
  - The Abyss Of Tharsis Op. 178
  - Return Of The Kings Op. 189
- Cresta
  - Uuniverse Of Esoss Op. 218
  - Tears And Sifius Op. 214
  - The Illusionist Op. 221
  - Voices Of Time Op. 183
  - Warriors In White Op. 180
- Madrisch
  - Andalos Op. 188
  - Salina And The Conquistador Op. 177
  - Myth Of Kratos Op. 225
  - Spanish Masquerade Op. 216
  - Zodiac Fiesta Op. 171
- Bärenburg
  - Heralon Op. 200
  - Wisdom Of Omega Op. 195
  - Terina’s Castle Op. 230
  - Eternal Reflection Op. 194
  - Skydust Op. 196
  - Final Triumph Op. 170

Symphonies on The Lake

- Stresa
- Isola Bella
- Laveno
- Pallanza
- Lesa
- Isola Madre
- Arona
- Santa Caterina
- Feriolo
- Angera
- Isola dei Pescatori
- Belgirate

== Recordings ==
- Romantic Rarities – Solo Piano LP Vinyl, Audio Cassette 1984 – CD 2023
- Music for Piano – Camille Saint-Saëns - 1989
- Scoring Selections for Piano and Orchestra– 1995
- Melodic MontageSolo Piano – 1999 – 2023
- Film Scoring for Piano and Orchestra - 2001
- Original Music for Film and Television - 2003
- Film Scoring for Piano and Orchestra - 2004
- Live at St. Martins In The Fields – Solo Piano – 2010
- Fantasia Suite – Solo Piano, Double CD – 2010 – 2015
- Bach Improvisations – Solo Piano – 2010 – 2023
- Fantasia Suite – Piano and Orchestra – 2017
- Bridges & Beyond – Fantasias – Piano & Orchestra 2018 – LP Vinyl 2023
- Legends of The Cosmos – Piano & Orchestra – 2018
- Divination – Piano & Orchestra – 2018
- The Labyrinth in the Stars – Piano & Orchestra – 2023
- The Cosmos Symphonic Suite – 12 CD's cycle – Piano & Orchestra – 2021 (CD I Faros, CD II Reischen, CD III Parschada, CD VI Viamala)
- Larsen-Saint-Saëns – Solo Piano – 2023

== Film Soundtracks ==
- The Healing Chamber - 2002 directed by Peter Dixon Discovery Channel
- Something to Believe In - 2003 directed by Bonnie Palef produced by Martin Scorsese
- Star Trek: First Contact -1996 Paramount Studio
- Mark Of Zorro - 2002 Original Silent
- World War III - 2000 Fox Studios
- Impressions - 1994 directed by Bruce Manning
- Big Shots - 2001 premiered at Cannes Film Festival
- Awakening Elegie - 2003 Music Video PBS
- Pierced Heart - 1996 Prophecy Films
- Innocents Mission - 2001 directed by Eric Tetrault
- Love Bytes - 2001 premiered at Sundance Film Festival
- Cannons and Flowers - 1996 BBC Documentary about Chopin and Poland
- Appassionato - Music Video
- Widow in White - 1997 directed by John Guillerman
- Scarecrow - 1995 Red Rocks Productions
- Fall River - 1999 Backstage Door Production
- Good bye America - 1996 Quantum Entertainment
