= Issak Tavior =

Israeli musical artist

Issak Tavior יצחק תויאור
- Born: 18 September 1943 (age 83); Haifa
- Origin: Israel
- Died: 7 February 2025 (aged 81)
- Genre: Religious
- Occupation: Composer
- Instrument: Piano
- Years active: 1983–present

Isaak Tavior (Hebrew: יצחק תויאור) was a pianist, composer and conductor. He was born in Haifa, Israel on 18 September 1943 to Rosa and Avraham Vichodetz. Tavior was the recipient of the Prize for Creativity in the field of Zionism in 2012, granted him by the Israeli Minister of Culture, Limor Livnat, for his 2004 composition "Vision of the Valley of Dry Bones" named for the prophecy of the same name.

== Biography ==
Tavior was born in Haifa. He began learning music at the age of seven. Throughout his musical studies, he received support from the America-Israel Cultural Foundation. Tavior graduated from the Dunya-Weizmann Conservatory in Haifa, where he was tutored by Rachel Katz. At the age of 14 he participated in "Tochnit Bechora", a classical music program at Israel radio network, Kol Israel. He would later regularly participate in classical music programs of the network. At 16, Tavior was accepted as a second year student to the Jerusalem Academy of Music and Dance, receiving a full scholarship, where he studied under the pianists Jerome Lowenthal and Alisa Hertz-Sommer. At the age of 20 he graduated from the Music Academy of Tel Aviv with Prof. Ilona Vincze-Kraus as a Master. Tavior completed his studies in Geneva, with Professor Hildebrand at the Conservatoire de Musique de Genève and in London, with pianist Peter Bernhard Feuchtwanger.

In 1967 Tavior met his future spouse Liora. The couple decided to make their home on one of Mount Meron's extensions, where they established a hamlet they named "Hemdat Yamim." The couple bore three children. Rona, Nevo and Yeshurun and are grandparents of eight grandchildren. They all live at Hemdat Yamim.

== Career ==
Tavior performed recitals at various radio stations in Europe, including ones in Amsterdam, Brussels, Geneva, Zurich, Munich, Dublin and Frankfurt. He also appeared as a solo pianist with the Kol Israel Symphony Orchestra (now renamed Jerusalem Symphony Orchestra), the Haifa Symphony Orchestra, Mozarteum Orchestra Salzburg and Radio Lugano.

Tavior recorded several select compositions by Beethoven, Chopin, Brahms, Bach, Mussorgsky, Liszt and others. In 1983, Tavior appeared at New York University in a concert marking Brahms's 150th birthday, where he played some of the composer's works. In 1985 he both lectured and performed at the University of Nuremberg on the subject of music history. Likewise, Tavior appeared at a series of recitals in many cities in Germany and the United States.

Tavior taught music in a number of high schools in Israel and conducted numerous choirs. He managed and directed the Hebrew University of Jerusalem Orchestra from 1971 to 1974. In 1975 Tavior co-founded the Karmiel Music Conservatory in Israel. In the late 1970s Tavior led an orchestra in Carmiel, Israel, funded by the national government and the Galilee Project with the aim of encouraging development in the region.

In 1980, Tavior was appointed the manager of the Upper Galilee Music Festival in Kibbutz Kfar Blum for the year. Tavior lectured on music at Haifa University from 1989–1997.

The Taviot couple established a music center in Hemdat Yamim, and, since 1981, recitals are performed by Mr. Tavior at his home. Tens of thousands attend the recitals, as well as his chamber concerts. Viennese music festivals and Schubert music marathons have also been held there

Tavior studied conducting and composition with Noam Sheriff in Israel, Hans Swarowski in Austria, Franco Ferrara in Italy and Milan Horvat in Salzburg. He conducted orchestras in Haifa and Rishon Lezion, the Nuremberg Symphony Orchestra, the Hof Symphony Orchestra and the German Radio Orchestra.

When playing, his works to denote national-historical events. In honor of the 15th of the Hebrew calendar month of Av or Āḇ (Tu b'Av), Tavior appears at Hemdat Yamim with the Tel Aviv Chamber Choir. In 2008, on Israeli Independence Day, Tavior performed in Germany with the Nuremberg Symphony Orchestra, the Oratorio choir of Jerusalem and the Zamir Choir of Bayreuth in both Nuremberg and Bayreuth.

In 2010 Tavior appeared at United Nations' Headquarters in New York City to mark International Holocaust Remembrance Day with the Nuremberg Symphony Orchestra, together with the Oratorio choir of Jerusalem and the Zamir choir of Bayreuth.

In 2011, on the occasion of marking the Day of Friendship between France and Germany, Tavior appeared in Annecy, France with a German radio symphony orchestra and the Tiv'on and Zamir choirs. In 2011 2014 and 2017, Tavior conducted concerts to mark the Holocaust Memorial Day at the United Nations' institution in Geneva, Switzerland with the same group. In 2014, Tavior appeared with the Bavarian Radio Symphony Orchestra and the Tiv'on and Zamir choirs in a live broadcast on Bavarian television to mark the Holocaust Remembrance Day. In 2015, to mark the 50th anniversary of the establishment of diplomatic Germany–Israel relations, Tavior appeared with the Haifa Symphony Orchestra and Misgav Ha'Galil Choir, Zamir choirs. Tavior also appeared in honor of that event in Bayreuth and Hof with the Hof Symphony Orchestra.

== Compositions ==
Tavior composed eight oratorios for symphony orchestra and soloists: Shema Israel (2003), Vision of the Valley of Dry Bones (2004), Mount Sinai (2006), The End of Days (2007), The Wisdom of Solomon (2011), In Thy Blood Live (see, Ezekiel 16:6) (2012), And I Have Pleaded (2014) and, In the Land of Moriah (2015).
