= Vlado Perlemuter =

Lithuanian-born French pianist and teacher (1904 - 2002)

- Born: Vladislas Perlemuter; 26 May 1904; Kaunas, Lithuania
- Died: 4 September 2002 Neuilly-sur-Seine, France
- Occupations: Musician, pedagogue
- Instrument: Piano
- Years active: 1919–1990
- Labels: Nimbus Records

Vladislas "Vlado" Perlemuter (26 May 1904 – 4 September 2002) was a Lithuanian-born French pianist and teacher.

== Biography ==
Vladislas (Vlado) Perlemuter was born to a Polish Jewish family, the third of four sons, in Kovno, Russia (now Kaunas in Lithuania). At the age of three, he lost the use of his left eye in an accident.

His family settled in France in 1907. In 1915, aged just 10, he was accepted by the Paris Conservatoire, studying first with Moritz Moszkowski (1915–17) and later with Alfred Cortot. At 15, he graduated from the Conservatoire, where he won the First Prize playing Gabriel Fauré’s Thème et variations before the composer, although Fauré was already deaf by that time. Perlemuter got to know Fauré rather well, living very close to him at the beginning of the 1920s. Perlemuter played to Fauré several Nocturnes, Ballades and the Variations and often played chess with him in the afternoons. There is a photo in existence of a mock wedding party with Perlemuter dressed up as a miller, and Fauré as a mayor.

In 1925, Perlemuter first heard Jeux d'eau by Maurice Ravel, and decided to study all the composer's music. In 1927, a friend of Perlemuter suggested he send Ravel a letter to ask for coaching in his works, as Ravel was already very popular. Ravel agreed, and Perlemuter studied all of Ravel's solo works for piano with the composer himself for a period of six months at his home in Montfort l'Amaury. Although Ravel was very critical and was often very harsh to him, Perlemuter became one of the leading exponents of Ravel's music. In 1929, Perlemuter played all of Ravel's complete piano works in two public recitals attended by the composer, a feat he repeated in 1987 at London's Wigmore Hall to mark the 50th anniversary of Ravel's death. Although Ravel was very reserved, he must have liked Perlemuter's playing because he asked him to play Ma mère l'Oye together.

Perlemuter's fascination with the works of Charles Dickens, William Shakespeare, William Turner and John Constable brought him to England in the early 1930s, and he returned frequently for concerts. He gave his first Wigmore Hall recital in 1938. During World War II, as a Jew, he was in danger in Nazi-occupied France, and was hunted by the Gestapo, barely managing to escape to Switzerland, where he lived until 1949. In 1951, he joined the teaching staff of the Paris Conservatoire, where he remained until 1977. That year he acted as a jury member for the Paloma O'Shea Santander International Piano Competition. Students from around the world, such as Catherine Thibon, Claudio Herrera and Christian Zacharias, were attracted by his fame as a pedagogue.

In 1958 Perlemuter was invited to the Dartington Summer School of Music in Devon, where he returned many times. He also taught at the Yehudi Menuhin School. His dicta included that a pianist must pedal not with the foot but with the ear; and must be able to make a crescendo without hurrying, and a diminuendo without slowing. He approached new pieces through the left hand, reading the piece from the bass upwards and he always practiced slowly, focusing on each hand separately.

His international career spanned over seventy years. He recorded the entire piano works of Ravel, as well as those by Chopin, Beethoven, Mendelssohn, Schumann and Fauré for Nimbus Records, as well as a complete Mozart sonatas for Vox Records. He returned to the Wigmore Hall in 1987 to commemorate the 50th anniversary of Ravel's death with two recitals comprising all the composer's piano works; a feat he repeated at the age of 89, with a valedictory recital at the Victoria Hall in Geneva.

His final years were compromised by memory loss and failing sight. He died at the American Hospital of Paris in Neuilly-sur-Seine on 4 September 2002 at the age of 98.

== Private life ==
Perlemuter married Jacqueline Deleveau in 1934; she died in 1982.

== Students ==
- Mireya Arboleda – Colombian pianist
- Michel Dalberto – French pianist and pedagogue
- Claudio Herrera – Mexican pianist
- Jacques Rouvier – French pianist and pedagogue
- Konstanze Eickhorst – German pianist
- Guillermo González Hernández – Spanish pianist
- Jean-François Heisser – French pianist
- Carter Larsen – American pianist/composer
- Mary Macnaghten - British Pianist
- Avi Schönfeld – Dutch-Israeli pianist/composer
- Joaquín Soriano – Spanish pianist
- Kathryn Stott – British pianist
- Melvyn Tan – British pianist and fortepiano player
- Christian Zacharias – German pianist and conductor
- Roy Howat – Scottish pianist and musicologist
- Michal Wesolowski – Polish pianist and pedagogue
- Ólafur Elíasson - Icelandic pianist
- Danielle Laval - French pianist
- Mariko Hallerdt - Japanese concert pianist and pedagogue

== Writings ==
- Ravel According to Ravel. London: Kahn & Averill. 2006. ISBN 978-1-871-08278-4.
