= Arnon Mantver =

Israeli official

- ארנון מנטבר
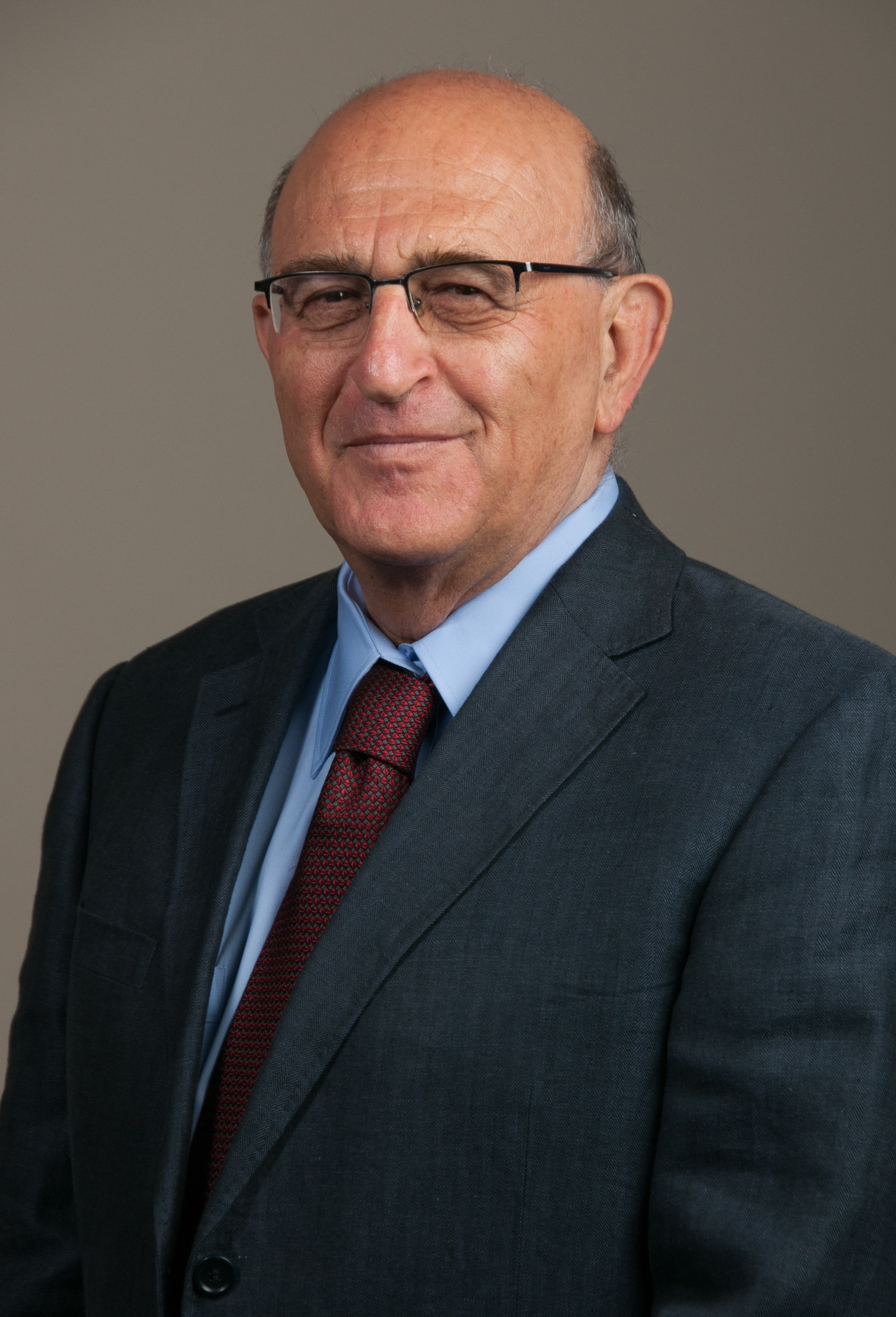
- Arnon Mantver (2014)

Arnon Mantver (Hebrew: ארנון מנטבר) is an Israeli official, who served as Director General of JDC-Israel from 1995–2014. In 2007, Mantver accepted the Israeli Lifetime Achievement Prize on behalf of JDC-Israel. Mantver has also held the following roles: Director General of the Department of Immigration and Absorption at the Jewish Agency (1989-1995); Director General of the Israeli Forum; Founder and Volunteer Chairman of Otzma; Manager of the Center for Immigration to Israel in the northwest United States.

== Biography ==
=== Early work on immigration and integration ===
Arnon Mantver began his career as the spokesman for the Ministry of Immigrant Absorption and later lead the marketing and advertising department.

From 1976–1979, Mantver held the position of Director of the Center for Immigration to Israel in the northwest United States, and was based in San Francisco, California. During those years, Mantver was in charge of encouraging Jewish immigration to Israel from the West Coast.

=== Director General of the Department of Immigration and Immigrant Absorption at the Jewish Agency ===
In March 1989, Mantver was appointed Director General of the Department of Immigration and Integration Department at the Jewish Agency. This came at a tumultuous time in the history of immigration to Israel, during which a large wave of approximately 600,000 immigrants arrived to Israel. This number includes 14,260 Ethiopians that arrived to Israel through Operation Solomon, which lead to the doubling of the number of immigrant absorption centers in Israel

Following Operation Solomon, Mantver was sent to study at Harvard University where he participated in a course for State and Local Management for advanced professionals in the John F. Kennedy School of Government

=== Director General of JDC-Israel ===
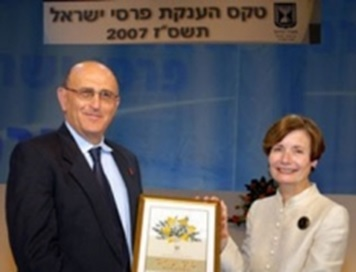
Under Mantver's leadership, JDC-Israel won the Israel Prize in 2007.

In 1995, Mantver was appointed Director General of JDC-Israel. JDC Israel (also known as the Joint) is a Jewish-American Humanitarian Organization that supports subsidiary welfare organizations that work with vulnerable populations in Israel and around the world. JDC-Israel operates on a budget of up to US$160 million a year.

During his tenure as Director General of JDC-Israel, Mantver developed a partnership model with the Government of Israel. He served as the Founding Chairman of Ashalim for the development of services for children at risk in cooperation with the Government of Israel and the New York Federation (est. 1997), Tevet for the integration of marginalized populations into the workforce in cooperation with Harry and Jeanette Weinberg Foundation (est. 2004), Massad Klita for the development of services for immigrants to Israel (est. 2002) and Israel Unlimited for the development of services for people with disabilities (est. 2010).

From 1999–2001, Mantver served in JDC-New York as Director of Eastern Europe, Asia and Africa, and the International Development Program.

Under Mantver's leadership, JDC-Israel won the Israel Prize in 2007. According to a written statement by the prize committee members, JDC-Israel was chosen as the winner because "JDC-Israel is a mission driven organization with undeniable expertise in the advancement of Israeli society. The vision, objectives and goals of JDC-Israel draw their strength from a social, humanitarian and egalitarian viewpoint."

In June 2014, Mantver concluded his role as Director General of JDC-Israel. He was succeeded by Professor Yossi Tamir, who served as Director of JDC-Eshel, an organization that develops services for the elderly in cooperation with JDC-Israel and the Government of Israel.

=== The Center for International Migration and Integration (CIMI) ===
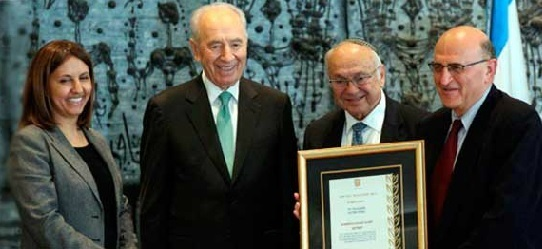
In 2012, CIMI under Mantver's leadership, was awarded the President's Medal for its work on combating human trafficking

Mantver continues to be active in the public sector as Founding Volunteer Chairman of the Center for International Migration and Integration (CIMI), which works on issues of formal and informal migration in Israel and around the world. He came up with the idea for CIMI after working as the Israeli representative to the International Organization for Migration (IOM). CIMI supports Israel in a wide range of migration management issues and strives to help Israel meet its obligations under international law and apply international standards and best practices in the field of migration. CIMI's main focus today is on assisting vulnerable migrant populations in Israel, including asylum seekers, migrants workers, and victims of trafficking. Some of CIMI's greatest achievements include the development and implementation of bilateral agreements on the recruitment of migrant workers between Israel and the governments of Thailand, Romania, Bulgaria and Moldova. These agreements, which are designed to combat human trafficking, have dramatically increased protections for migrant workers. In 2012, CIMI was awarded the President's Medal for its work on combating human trafficking.
