= Sergei Polusmiak =

Ukrainian musician

Sergei Polusmiak (Russian: Сергей Полусмяк Ukrainian: Сергій Полусм'як) born in 1951 in Kharkiv, Ukraine is a Ukrainian Pianist "Merited Artist of Ukraine". He graduated from Kharkiv Music College in 1969 and from Kharkiv Conservatory ". He graduated from Kharkiv Music College in 1969 and from Kharkiv Conservatory in 1975, where he studied with Regina Horowitz, sister of Vladimir Horowitz. In 1978 he received the Post Graduate Diploma at Kiev Conservatory, Ukraine and in 1981 completed Advanced Studies at Moscow State Tchaikovsky Conservatory, Russia. From 1975 to 1998 Sergei Polusmiak was teaching at Kharkiv Conservatory and at the Kharkiv Special Music School for Gifted Children. Sergei Polusmiak started his professional career as a music educator and as a concert pianist by teaching, giving master classes, playing solo piano recitals, chamber music recitals, and as a soloist with symphony orchestras. For his contribution as a concert pianist Sergei Polusmiak was awarded the title of Merited Artist of Ukraine by the President of Ukraine. In 1996 Sergei Polusmiak became a Full Professor of piano at Kharkiv Institute of Arts.

Sergei Polusmiak performed concerts in Russia, France, Germany, Belgium, Mexico, Argentina, China and the United States. He was presented "Sergei at the Aronoff" piano program at the Grand Opening of the Aronoff Center for the Arts, Cincinnati, and has appeared as a soloist with Kharkiv Philharmonic Orchestra, Ukraine; Cincinnati Chamber Orchestra, Keith Lockhart, Music Director, USA; Northern Kentucky Symphony, USA; Russian Chamber Orchestra of San Francisco, USA and Shanghai Philharmonic, Shanghai, China.

Sergei Polusmiak has been a jury member of major international piano competitions, including Vladimir Krainev International Piano Competition, Kharkiv, Ukraine; the First International Competition for Young Pianists in Memory of Vladimir Horowitz, Kyiv, Ukraine; Joanna Hodges International Piano Competition, Palm Desert, California, USA; Lysenko International Piano Competition, Kyiv, Ukraine; Milosh Magin International Piano Competition, Paris, France; Rameau au Chateau International Piano Competition, Cosne sur Loire, France; World Piano Competition, Cincinnati, USA; International Piano Competition "Svyato Muz" Lugansk, Ukraine and George Gershwin International Piano Competition, Philadelphia, USA. He was also founder and artistic director of the Ukrainian-France Summer Music Festival in Kharkiv, Ukraine; director of Ukrainian Children's Music Theater and director of Summer Piano Institute at Northern Kentucky University.

Sergei Polusmiak has conducted master classes in Oberlin Conservatory of Music, Oberlin, USA; College Conservatory of Music, University of Cincinnati, USA; Joanna Hodges International Symposium, Vancouver, USA; "Musicalia", Toulouse, France; "Encuentro International de Pianistas", San Juan, Argentina; Oriental Arts Center, Shanghai, China and others.

The students of Sergei Polusmiak have won numerous prizes at international piano competitions and performed with orchestras such as Kharkiv Philharmonic, Ukraine; Lugansk Philharmonic, Ukraine; The St. Petersburg Philharmonic, Russian; L’Orchestre Symphonique de Montreal, Canada; Netherland Symphony Orchestra; Corpus Christi Symphony Orchestra, USA; Northwest Florida Symphony Orchestra, USA; Kentucky Symphony Orchestra, USA; Russian Chamber Orchestra of San Francisco, USA; Minnesota Sinfonia, USA; Jefferson Symphony Orchestra, USA; Shanghai Philharmonic, China; The Cincinnati Chamber Orchestra and The Cincinnati Symphony Orchestra, USA.

Sergei has recorded five CDs: Sergei Plays Sergei and Alexander, solo piano works of Rachmaninoff and Scriabin; "Hommage a Shostakovich", music for Two Pianos with French pianist, Thérèse Dussaut; "Music for Clarinet and Piano" with Ukrainian prodigy, Alexander Bedenko; "Beautiful Music For Friends, The Language of Feelings", solo piano music by Bach, Mozart, Chopin, Liszt, Brahms and Rachmaninoff and "Therese Dussaut, Sergei Polusmiak, Piano 4 hands", music by Tchaikovsky and Dvorak with Therese Dussaut.
