= Haim Gaifman =

American logician (born 1934)

- חיים גייפמן
- Born: September 26, 1934
- Education: University of California, Berkeley; Hebrew University
- Scientific career
- Fields: Logic, probability theory, philosophy of language
- Workplaces: Columbia University; Hebrew University
- Doctoral advisor: Alfred Tarski
- Doctoral students: Arnon Avron; Shlomo Vinner

Haim Gaifman (Hebrew: חיים גייפמן; born 1934) is a logician, probability theorist, and philosopher of language who is professor of philosophy at Columbia University.

== Education and career ==
In 1958 he received his M.Sc. at Hebrew University. Then in 1962, he received his Ph.D. at University of California, Berkeley under Alfred Tarski on the topic of infinite Boolean algebras. Since, he has held various permanent and visiting positions in mathematics, philosophy and computer science departments. While he was professor of mathematics at the Hebrew University, he taught courses in philosophy and directed the program in History and Philosophy of Science.

== Philosophical work ==
Gaifman works in mathematical logic and developed the iterated ultrapower technique in set theory and models of Peano arithmetic. Further, he has results in the foundations of probability, defining probabilities on first-order and on richer languages. He has also worked in philosophy of language, philosophy of mathematics, and theoretical computer science.
