= Baruch Arnon =

Classical pianist

Baruch Arnon (born 8 July 1940 in Novi Sad, Yugoslavia) is a classical pianist and renowned music teacher. He is currently a faculty member at the Juilliard School in New York and has previously taught music at the Israel Academy of Music in Tel Aviv and Musica de Camera.

== Education ==
He began his music studies at an early age and studied piano with Ilona Vincze-Kraus at Israel Academy of Music. By 1959 he was taking master classes under Edward Steuermann. In 1962 he was studying at the Juilliard School with Irwin Freundlich and earned his B.M. Studying under Bernard Wagenaar and Jacob Druckman, he earned his M.S. in 1965.

== Professional information ==
Between 1960 and 1962 he taught piano at the Israel Academy of Music. In 1972 he became the artistic director of the Musica da Camera, a position he held until 1980. In 1971 he began teaching at the Juilliard School. He has been teaching piano literature and graduate studies there since 1991 and became a professor of chamber music in 2001.

He currently lives in New York and spends his time teaching there.

== Bibliography and external links ==
- Juilliard online
- Ashkenazy, Vladimir. Collins Encyclopedia of Classical Music. Collins; new ed (2000) (ISBN 978-0-00-472390-7).
- Philip, Robert. Performing Music in the Age of Recording. Yale University Press (2004) (ISBN 978-0-300-10246-8).
- Hall, Charles J. Chronology of Western Classical Music, Volume 2. Routledge (2002) (ISBN 978-0-415-94216-4).
- Zaslaw, Neal. Mozart's Symphonies: Context, Performance Practice, Reception. Oxford University Press; reprint ed (1991) (ISBN 978-0-19-816286-5).
