= Valeria de Paiva =

Brazilian mathematician, logician, and computer scientist

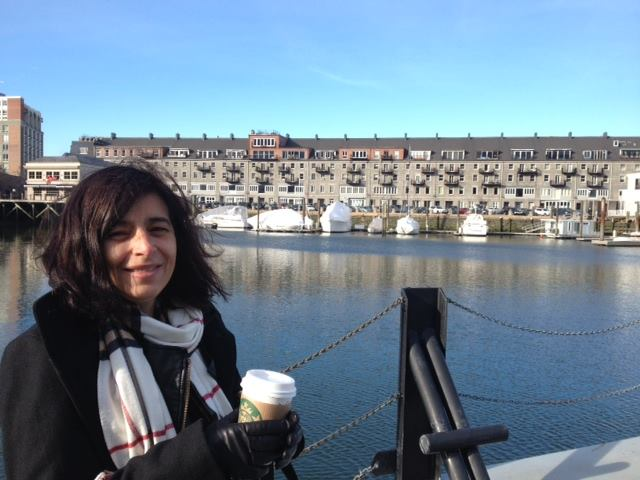
- Born: Valeria Correa Vaz de Paiva
- Education: University of Cambridge (PhD)
- Scientific career
- Fields: Mathematics; Category theory; Proof theory; Type systems; Semantics
- Workplaces: PARC; Nuance Communications; University of Birmingham
- Thesis: The Dialectica Categories (1988)
- Doctoral advisor: Martin Hyland
- Website: vcvpaiva.github.io

Valeria Correa Vaz de Paiva is a Brazilian mathematician, logician, and computer scientist. Her work includes research on logical approaches to computation, especially using category theory, knowledge representation and natural language semantics, and functional programming with a focus on foundations and type theories.

== Education ==
De Paiva earned a bachelor's degree in mathematics in 1982, a master's degree in 1984 (on pure algebra) and completed a doctorate at the University of Cambridge in 1988, under the supervision of Martin Hyland. Her thesis introduced Dialectica spaces, a categorical way of constructing models of linear logic, based on Kurt Gödel's Dialectica interpretation.

== Career and research ==
She worked for nine years at PARC in Palo Alto, California, and also worked at Rearden Commerce and Cuil before joining Nuance. She is an honorary research fellow in computer science at the University of Birmingham. She is currently on the Council of the Division for Logic, Methodology and Philosophy of Science and Technology of the International Union of History and Philosophy of Science and Technology (2020–2023).

=== Selected publications ===
- Applied Category Theory in Chemistry, Computing, and Social Networks. (with Baez, Cho, Ciccala and Otter). Notices of the American Mathematical Society, vol. 69, number 2, February 2022.
- Term Assignment for Intuitionistic Linear Logic. (with Benton, Bierman and Hyland). Technical Report 262, University of Cambridge Computer Laboratory. August 1992.
- Lineales. (with J.M.E. Hyland) In "O que nos faz pensar" Special number in Logic of "Cadernos do Dept. de Filosofia da PUC", Pontificial Catholic University of Rio de Janeiro, April 1991.
- A Dialectica-like Model of Linear Logic. In Proceedings of Category Theory and Computer Science, Manchester, UK, September 1989. Springer-Verlag LNCS 389 (eds. D. Pitt, D. Rydeheard, P. Dybjer, A. Pitts and A. Poigne).
- The Dialectica Categories. In Proc of Categories in Computer Science and Logic, Boulder, CO, 1987. Contemporary Mathematics, vol 92, American Mathematical Society, 1989 (eds. J. Gray and A. Scedrov)
