= Noncommutative logic =

Extension of linear logic

Noncommutative logic is an extension of linear logic that combines the commutative connectives of linear logic with the noncommutative multiplicative connectives of the Lambek calculus. Its sequent calculus relies on the structure of order varieties (a family of cyclic orders that may be viewed as a species of structure), and the correctness criterion for its proof nets is given in terms of partial permutations. It also has a denotational semantics in which formulas are interpreted by modules over some specific Hopf algebras.

== Noncommutativity in logic ==
By extension, the term noncommutative logic is also used by a number of authors to refer to a family of substructural logics in which the exchange rule is inadmissible. The remainder of this article is devoted to a presentation of this acceptance of the term.

The oldest noncommutative logic is the Lambek calculus, which gave rise to the class of logics known as categorial grammars. Since the publication of Jean-Yves Girard's linear logic there have been several new noncommutative logics proposed, namely the cyclic linear logic of David Yetter, the pomset logic of Christian Retoré, and the noncommutative logics BV and NEL.

Noncommutative logic is sometimes called ordered logic, since it is possible with most proposed noncommutative logics to impose a total or partial order on the formulas in sequents. However this is not fully general since some noncommutative logics do not support such an order, such as Yetter's cyclic linear logic. Although most noncommutative logics do not allow weakening or contraction together with noncommutativity, this restriction is not necessary.

=== The Lambek calculus ===
Joachim Lambek proposed the first non-commutative logic in his 1958 paper Mathematics of Sentence Structure to model the combinatory possibilities of the syntax of natural languages. In his subsequent 1961 paper On the calculus of syntactic types, he extended the analysis to cover non-associativity as well. His calculus has since become one of the fundamental formalisms of computational linguistics.

=== Cyclic linear logic ===
David N. Yetter proposed a weaker structural rule in place of the exchange rule of linear logic, yielding cyclic linear logic. Sequents of cyclic linear logic form a cycle, and so are invariant under rotation, where multipremise rules glue their cycles together at the formulas described in the rules. The calculus supports three structural modalities, a self-dual modality allowing exchange, but still linear, and the usual exponentials (? and !) of linear logic, allowing nonlinear structural rules to be used together with exchange.

=== Pomset logic ===
Pomset logic was proposed by Christian Retoré in a semantic formalism with two dual sequential operators existing together with the usual tensor product and par operators of linear logic, the first logic proposed to have both commutative and noncommutative operators. A sequent calculus for the logic was given, but it lacked a cut-elimination theorem; instead the sense of the calculus was established through a denotational semantics.

=== BV and NEL ===
Alessio Guglielmi proposed a variation of Retoré's calculus, BV, in which the two noncommutative operations are collapsed onto a single, self-dual, operator, and proposed a novel proof calculus, the calculus of structures to accommodate the calculus. The principal novelty of the calculus of structures was its pervasive use of deep inference, which it was argued is necessary for calculi combining commutative and noncommutative operators; this explanation concurs with the difficulty of designing sequent systems for pomset logic that have cut-elimination.

Lutz Straßburger devised a related system, NEL, also in the calculus of structures in which linear logic with the mix rule appears as a subsystem.

== See also ==
- Ordered type system, a substructural type system
- Quantum logic
