= Takeuti =

Takeuti may refer to:

- Takeuti conjecture, a conjecture by Gaisi Takeuti
- The Japanese family name Takeuchi, including:
  - Gaisi Takeuti (1926–2017), Japanese mathematician
