= Chu space =

Generalized topological space

Chu spaces generalize the notion of topological space by dropping the requirements that the set of open sets be closed under union and finite intersection, that the open sets be extensional, and that the membership predicate (of points in open sets) be two-valued. The definition of continuous function remains unchanged other than having to be worded carefully to continue to make sense after these generalizations.

The name is due to Po-Hsiang Chu, who originally constructed a verification of autonomous categories as a graduate student under the direction of Michael Barr in 1979.

== Definition ==
Understood statically, a Chu space (A, r, X) over a set K consists of a set A of points, a set X of states, and a function r : A × X → K. This makes it an A × X matrix with entries drawn from K, or equivalently a K-valued binary relation between A and X (ordinary binary relations being 2-valued).

Understood dynamically, Chu spaces transform in the manner of topological spaces, with A as the set of points, X as the set of open sets, and r as the membership relation between them, where K is the set of all possible degrees of membership of a point in an open set. The counterpart of a continuous function from (A, r, X) to (B, s, Y) is a pair (f, g) of functions f : A → B, g : Y → X satisfying the adjointness condition s(f(a), y) = r(a, g(y)) for all a ∈ A and y ∈ Y. That is, f maps points forwards at the same time as g maps states backwards. The adjointness condition makes g the inverse image function f^{−1}, while the choice of X for the codomain of g corresponds to the requirement for continuous functions that the inverse image of open sets be open. Such a pair is called a Chu transform or morphism of Chu spaces.

A topological space (X, T) where X is the set of points and T the set of open sets, can be understood as a Chu space (X,∈,T) over {0, 1}. That is, the points of the topological space become those of the Chu space while the open sets become states and the membership relation " ∈ " between points and open sets is made explicit in the Chu space. The condition that the set of open sets be closed under arbitrary (including empty) union and finite (including empty) intersection becomes the corresponding condition on the columns of the matrix. A continuous function f: X → X' between two topological spaces becomes an adjoint pair (f,g) in which f is now paired with a realization of the continuity condition constructed as an explicit witness function g exhibiting the requisite open sets in the domain of f.

== Categorical structure ==
The category of Chu spaces over K and their maps is denoted by Chu(Set, K). As is clear from the symmetry of the definitions, it is a self-dual category: it is equivalent (in fact isomorphic) to its dual, the category obtained by reversing all the maps. It is furthermore a *-autonomous category with dualizing object (K, λ, {*}) where λ : K × {*} → K is defined by λ(k, *) = k (Barr 1979). As such it is a model of Jean-Yves Girard's linear logic (Girard 1987).

== Variants ==
The more general enriched category Chu(V, k) originally appeared in an appendix to Barr (1979). The Chu space concept originated with Michael Barr and the details were developed by his student Po-Hsiang Chu, whose master's thesis formed the appendix. Ordinary Chu spaces arise as the case V = Set, that is, when the monoidal category V is specialized to the cartesian closed category Set of sets and their functions, but were not studied in their own right until more than a decade after the appearance of the more general enriched notion. A variant of Chu spaces, called dialectica spaces, due to de Paiva (1989) replaces the map condition (1) with the map condition (2):

1. s(f(a), y) = r(a, g(y)).
2. s(f(a), y) ≤ r(a, g(y)).

== Universality ==
The category Top of topological spaces and their continuous functions embeds in Chu(Set, 2) in the sense that there exists a full and faithful functor F : Top → Chu(Set, 2) providing for each topological space (X, T) its representation F((X, T)) = (X, ∈, T) as noted above. This representation is moreover a realization in the sense of Pultr and Trnková (1980), namely that the representing Chu space has the same set of points as the represented topological space and transforms in the same way via the same functions.

Chu spaces are remarkable for the wide variety of familiar structures they realize. Lafont and Streicher (1991) point out that Chu spaces over 2 realize both topological spaces and coherent spaces (introduced by J.-Y. Girard (1987) to model linear logic), while Chu spaces over K realize any category of vector spaces over a field whose cardinality is at most that of K. This was extended by Vaughan Pratt (1995) to the realization of k-ary relational structures by Chu spaces over 2^{k}. For example, the category Grp of groups and their homomorphisms is realized by Chu(Set, 8) since the group multiplication can be organized as a ternary relation. Chu(Set, 2) realizes a wide range of "logical" structures such as semilattices, distributive lattices, complete and completely distributive lattices, Boolean algebras, complete atomic Boolean algebras, etc. Further information on this and other aspects of Chu spaces, including their application to the modeling of concurrent behavior, may be found at Chu Spaces.

== Applications ==
=== Automata ===
Chu spaces can serve as a model of concurrent computation in automata theory to express branching time and true concurrency. Chu spaces exhibit the quantum mechanical phenomena of complementarity and uncertainty. The complementarity arises as the duality of information and time, automata and schedules, and states and events. Uncertainty arises when a measurement is defined to be a morphism such that increasing structure in the observed object reduces the clarity of observation. This uncertainty can be calculated numerically from its form factor to yield the usual Heisenberg uncertainty relation. Chu spaces correspond to wavefunctions as vectors of Hilbert space.
