= *-autonomous category =

Symmetric monoidal closed category equipped with a dualizing object

In mathematics, a *-autonomous (read "star-autonomous") category is a symmetric monoidal closed category equipped with a dualizing object $\bot$. The concept is also referred to as Grothendieck—Verdier category in view of its relation to the notion of Verdier duality.

== Definition ==
Let $\mathcal C$ be a symmetric monoidal closed category $\langle\mathcal C, \otimes, I, \Rightarrow \rangle$. For any pair of objects, in particular A and $\bot$, there exists a morphism

$$\partial_{A,\bot}:A\to(A\Rightarrow\bot)\Rightarrow\bot$$

defined as the image by the bijection defining the monoidal closure

$$\mathrm{Hom}((A\Rightarrow\bot)\otimes A,\bot)\cong\mathrm{Hom}(A,(A\Rightarrow\bot)\Rightarrow\bot)$$

of the evaluation map:

$$\mathrm{eval}_{A,A\Rightarrow\bot}\circ\gamma_{A\Rightarrow\bot,A} : (A\Rightarrow\bot)\otimes A\to\bot$$

where $\gamma$ is the symmetry of the tensor product. An object $\bot$ of the category $\mathcal C$ is called dualizing when the associated morphism $\partial_{A,\bot}$ is an isomorphism for every object A of $\mathcal C$.

Equivalently, a *-autonomous category is a symmetric monoidal category $\mathcal C$ together with a functor $(-)^*:\mathcal C^{\mathrm{op}}\to\mathcal C$ such that for every object A there is a natural isomorphism $A\cong{A^{**}}$, and for every three objects A, B and C there is a natural bijection

$$\mathrm{Hom}(A\otimes B,C^*)\cong\mathrm{Hom}(A,(B\otimes C)^*)$$.

The dualizing object of $\mathcal C$ is then defined by $\bot=I^*$. The equivalence of the two definitions is shown by identifying $A^*=A\Rightarrow\bot$.

== Properties ==
Compact closed categories are *-autonomous, with the monoidal unit as the dualizing object. Conversely, if the unit of a *-autonomous category is a dualizing object then there is a canonical family of maps

$$A^*\otimes B^* \to (B\otimes A)^*$$.

These are all isomorphisms if and only if the *-autonomous category is compact closed.

== Examples ==
A familiar example is the category of finite-dimensional vector spaces over any field k made monoidal with the usual tensor product of vector spaces. The dualizing object is k, the one-dimensional vector space, and dualization corresponds to transposition. Although the category of all vector spaces over k is not *-autonomous, suitable extensions to categories of topological vector spaces can be made *-autonomous.

On the other hand, the category of topological vector spaces contains an extremely wide full subcategory, the category Ste of stereotype spaces, which is a *-autonomous category with the dualizing object ${\mathbb C}$ and the tensor product $\circledast$.

Various models of linear logic form *-autonomous categories, the earliest of which was Jean-Yves Girard's category of coherence spaces.

The category of complete semilattices with morphisms preserving all joins but not necessarily meets is *-autonomous with dualizer the chain of two elements. A degenerate example (all homsets of cardinality at most one) is given by any Boolean algebra (as a partially ordered set) made monoidal using conjunction for the tensor product and taking 0 as the dualizing object.

The formalism of Verdier duality gives further examples of *-autonomous categories. For example, Boyarchenko & Drinfeld (2013) mention that the bounded derived category of constructible l-adic sheaves on an algebraic variety has this property. Further examples include derived categories of constructible sheaves on various kinds of topological spaces.

An example of a self-dual category that is not *-autonomous is finite linear orders and continuous functions, which has * but is not autonomous: its dualizing object is the two-element chain but there is no tensor product.

The category of sets and their partial injections is self-dual because the converse of the latter is again a partial injection.

The concept of *-autonomous category was introduced by Michael Barr in 1979 in a monograph with that title. Barr defined the notion for the more general situation of V-categories, categories enriched in a symmetric monoidal or autonomous category V. The definition above specializes Barr's definition to the case V = Set of ordinary categories, those whose homobjects form sets (of morphisms). Barr's monograph includes an appendix by his student Po-Hsiang Chu that develops the details of a construction due to Barr showing the existence of nontrivial *-autonomous V-categories for all symmetric monoidal categories V with pullbacks, whose objects became known a decade later as Chu spaces.

== Non symmetric case ==
In a biclosed monoidal category $\mathcal C$, not necessarily symmetric, it is still possible to define a dualizing object and then define a *-autonomous category as a biclosed monoidal category with a dualizing object. They are equivalent definitions, as in the symmetric case.

== See also ==
- Autonomous category
