= Dialectica space =

Dialectica spaces are a categorical way of constructing models of linear logic.

They were introduced by Valeria de Paiva in her doctoral thesis, as a way of modeling both linear logic and Gödel's Dialectica interpretation—hence the name.

Given a category C and a specific object K of C with certain (logical) properties, one can construct the category of Dialectica spaces over C, whose objects are pairs of objects of C, related by a C-morphism into K. Morphisms of Dialectica spaces are similar to Chu space morphisms, but instead of an equality condition, they have an inequality condition, which is read as a logical implication: the first object implies the second.
