= Weakening =

Weakening may refer to

- Weakening (logic), a structural rule in proof theory
- Weakening (linguistics), a sound change that can be described as weakening a consonant
