= Comparison of programming languages (algebraic data type) =

This article compares the syntax for defining and instantiating an algebraic data type (ADT), sometimes also referred to as a tagged union, in various programming languages.

== Examples of algebraic data types ==
=== ATS ===
In ATS, an ADT may be defined with:

datatype tree =
	| Empty of () 
	| Node of (int, tree, tree)

And instantiated as:

val my_tree = Node(42, Node(0, Empty, Empty), Empty)

Additionally in ATS dataviewtypes are the linear type version of ADTs for the purpose of providing in the setting of manual memory management with the convenience of pattern matching. An example program might look like:

(* Alternatively one can use the datavtype keyword *)
dataviewtype int_or_string_vt (bool) =
	| String_vt (true) of string
	| Int_vt (false) of int

(* Alternatively one can use the vtypedef keyword *)
viewtypedef Int_or_String_vt = [b: bool] int_or_string_vt b

fn print_int_or_string (i_or_s: Int_or_String_vt): void =
	case+ i_or_s of
	(* ~ indicates i_or_s will be implicitly freed in this case *)
	| ~String_vt(s) => println!(s)
	(* @ indicates i_or_s must be explicitly freed in this case *)
	| @Int_vt(i) => begin
			$extfcall(void, "fprintf", stdout_ref, "%d\n", i);
			free@i_or_s;
		end

implement main0 (): void = let
	val string_hello_world = String_vt "Hello, world!"
	val int_0 = Int_vt 0
in
	print_int_or_string string_hello_world;
	print_int_or_string int_0;
	(* which prints:
	Hello, world!
	0
	*)
end

=== Ceylon ===
In Ceylon, an ADT may be defined with:

abstract class Tree()
    of empty | Node {}

object empty
    extends Tree() {}

final class Node(shared Integer val, shared Tree left, shared Tree right)
    extends Tree() {}

And instantiated as:

value myTree = Node(42, Node(0, empty, empty), empty);

=== Clean ===
In Clean, an ADT may be defined with:

:: Tree
  = Empty
  | Node Int Tree Tree

And instantiated as:

myTree = Node 42 (Node 0 Empty Empty) Empty

=== C++ ===
In C++, an ADT may be defined with:

struct Empty final {};

struct Node final {
    int value;
    std::unique_ptr<std::variant<Empty, Node>> left;
    std::unique_ptr<std::variant<Empty, Node>> right;
};

using Tree = std::variant<Empty, Node>;

And instantiated as:

Tree myTree { Node{
    42,
    std::make_unique<Tree>(Node{
        0,
        std::make_unique<Tree>(),
        std::make_unique<Tree>()
    }),
    std::make_unique<Tree>()
} };

=== Dart ===
In Dart, an ADT may be defined with:

sealed class Tree {}

final class Empty extends Tree {}

final class Node extends Tree {
  final int value;
  final Tree left, right;

  Node(this.value, this.left, this.right);
}

And instantiated as:

final myTree = Node(42, Node(0, Empty(), Empty()), Empty());

=== Elm ===
In Elm, an ADT may be defined with:

type Tree
  = Empty
  | Node Int Tree Tree

And instantiated as:

myTree = Node 42 (Node 0 Empty Empty) Empty

=== F# ===
In F#, an ADT may be defined with:

type Tree =
    | Empty
    | Node of int * Tree * Tree

And instantiated as:

let myTree = Node(42, Node(0, Empty, Empty), Empty)

=== F* ===
In F*, an ADT may be defined with:

type tree =
  | Empty : tree
  | Node : value:nat -> left:tree -> right:tree -> tree

And instantiated as:

let my_tree = Node 42 (Node 0 Empty Empty) Empty

=== Free Pascal ===
In Free Pascal (in standard ISO Pascal mode), an ADT may be defined with variant records:

{$mode ISO}
program MakeTree;

type TreeKind = (Empty, Node);
  PTree = ^Tree;
  Tree = record
    case Kind: TreeKind of
      Empty: ();
      Node: (
        Value: Integer;
        Left, Right: PTree;
      );
  end;

And instantiated as:

var MyTree: PTree;

begin new(MyTree, Node);
  with MyTree^ do begin
    Value := 42;
    new(Left,  Node);
    with Left^ do begin
      Value := 0;
      new(Left,  Empty);
      new(Right, Empty);
    end;
    new(Right, Empty);
  end;
end.

=== Haskell ===
In Haskell, an ADT may be defined with:

data Tree
    = Empty
    | Node Int Tree Tree

And instantiated as:

myTree = Node 42 (Node 0 Empty Empty) Empty

=== Haxe ===
In Haxe, an ADT may be defined with:

enum Tree {
	Empty;
	Node(value:Int, left:Tree, right:Tree);
}

And instantiated as:

var myTree = Node(42, Node(0, Empty, Empty), Empty);

=== Hope ===
In Hope, an ADT may be defined with:

data tree == empty
          ++ node (num # tree # tree);

And instantiated as:

dec mytree : tree;
--- mytree <= node (42, node (0, empty, empty), empty);

=== Idris ===
In Idris, an ADT may be defined with:

data Tree
    = Empty
    | Node Nat Tree Tree

And instantiated as:

myTree : Tree
myTree = Node 42 (Node 0 Empty Empty) Empty

=== Java ===
In Java, an ADT may be defined with:

sealed interface Tree {
    record Empty() implements Tree {}
    record Node(int value, Tree left, Tree right) implements Tree {}
}

And instantiated as:

var myTree = new Tree.Node(
    42,
    new Tree.Node(0, new Tree.Empty(), new Tree.Empty()),
    new Tree.Empty()
);

=== Julia ===
In Julia, an ADT may be defined with:

struct Empty
end

struct Node
    value::Int
    left::Union{Empty, Node}
    right::Union{Empty, Node}
end

const Tree = Union{Empty, Node}

And instantiated as:

mytree = Node(42, Node(0, Empty(), Empty()), Empty())

=== Kotlin ===
In Kotlin, an ADT may be defined with:

sealed class Tree {
    object Empty : Tree()
    data class Node(val value: Int, val left: Tree, val right: Tree) : Tree()
}

And instantiated as:

val myTree = Tree.Node(
    42,
    Tree.Node(0, Tree.Empty, Tree.Empty),
    Tree.Empty,
)

=== Limbo ===
In Limbo, an ADT may be defined with:

Tree: adt {
	pick {
	Empty =>
	Node =>
		value: int;
		left: ref Tree;
		right: ref Tree;
	}
};

And instantiated as:

myTree := ref Tree.Node(
	42,
	ref Tree.Node(0, ref Tree.Empty(), ref Tree.Empty()),
	ref Tree.Empty()
);

=== Mercury ===
In Mercury, an ADT may be defined with:

:- type tree
    --->    empty
    ;       node(int, tree, tree).

And instantiated as:

:- func my_tree = tree.
my_tree = node(42, node(0, empty, empty), empty).

=== Miranda ===
In Miranda, an ADT may be defined with:

tree ::=
    Empty
    | Node num tree tree

And instantiated as:

my_tree = Node 42 (Node 0 Empty Empty) Empty

=== Nemerle ===
In Nemerle, an ADT may be defined with:

variant Tree
{
    | Empty
    | Node {
        value: int;
        left: Tree;
        right: Tree;
    }
}

And instantiated as:

def myTree = Tree.Node(
    42,
    Tree.Node(0, Tree.Empty(), Tree.Empty()),
    Tree.Empty(),
);

=== Nim ===
In Nim, an ADT may be defined with:

type
  TreeKind = enum
    tkEmpty
    tkNode

  Tree = ref TreeObj

  TreeObj = object
    case kind: TreeKind
    of tkEmpty:
      discard
    of tkNode:
      value: int
      left, right: Tree

And instantiated as:

let myTree = Tree(kind: tkNode, value: 42,
                  left: Tree(kind: tkNode, value: 0,
                             left: Tree(kind: tkEmpty),
                             right: Tree(kind: tkEmpty)),
                  right: Tree(kind: tkEmpty))

=== OCaml ===
In OCaml, an ADT may be defined with:

type tree =
  | Empty
  | Node of int * tree * tree

And instantiated as:

let my_tree = Node (42, Node (0, Empty, Empty), Empty)

=== Opa ===
In Opa, an ADT may be defined with:

type tree =
  { empty } or
  { node, int value, tree left, tree right }

And instantiated as:

my_tree = {
  node,
  value: 42,
  left: {
    node,
    value: 0,
    left: { empty },
    right: { empty }
  },
  right: { empty }
}

=== OpenCog ===
In OpenCog's Atomese, an ADT is constructed inside the graph-based AtomSpace using explicit type constructors like SignatureLink and TypeChoice to represent sum and product types. A binary tree ADT may be defined with:

; Define the "Tree" sum type choice
(TypeChoice
    (DefinedTypeNode "Tree")
    (TypeSetLink
        (TypeNode "Empty")
        (SignatureLink
            (TypeNode "Node")
            (TypeSetLink 
                (TypeNode "NumberNode") 
                (DefinedTypeNode "Tree") 
                (DefinedTypeNode "Tree")))))

And instantiated as a graph structure:

; Instantiate a tree structure equivalent to: Node(42, Node(0, Empty, Empty), Empty)
(Node
    (NumberNode "42")
    (Node
        (NumberNode "0")
        (Empty)
        (Empty))
    (Empty))

=== PureScript ===
In PureScript, an ADT may be defined with:

data Tree
  = Empty
  | Node Int Tree Tree

And instantiated as:

myTree = Node 42 (Node 0 Empty Empty) Empty

=== Python ===
In Python, an ADT may be defined with:

from __future__ import annotations
from dataclasses import dataclass

@dataclass
class Empty:
    pass

@dataclass
class Node:
    value: int
    left: Tree
    right: Tree

Tree = Empty | Node

And instantiated as:

my_tree = Node(42, Node(0, Empty(), Empty()), Empty())

=== Racket ===
In Typed Racket, an ADT may be defined with:

(struct Empty ())
(struct Node ([value : Integer] [left : Tree] [right : Tree]))
(define-type Tree (U Empty Node))

And instantiated as:

(define my-tree (Node 42 (Node 0 (Empty) (Empty)) (Empty)))

=== Reason ===
In Reason, an ADT may be defined with:

type Tree =
  | Empty
  | Node(int, Tree, Tree);

And instantiated as:

let myTree = Node(42, Node(0, Empty, Empty), Empty);

=== ReScript ===
In ReScript, an ADT may be defined with:

type rec Tree =
  | Empty
  | Node(int, Tree, Tree)

And instantiated as:

let myTree = Node(42, Node(0, Empty, Empty), Empty)

=== Rocq ===
In Rocq, an ADT may be defined with:

Inductive tree : Type :=
| empty : tree
| node : nat -> tree -> tree -> tree.

And instantiated as:

Definition my_tree := node 42 (node 0 empty empty) empty.

=== Rust ===
In Rust, an ADT may be defined with:

enum Tree {
    Empty,
    Node(i32, Box<Tree>, Box<Tree>),
}

And instantiated as:

let my_tree = Tree::Node(
    42,
    Box::new(Tree::Node(0, Box::new(Tree::Empty), Box::new(Tree::Empty)),
    Box::new(Tree::Empty),
);

=== Scala ===
==== Scala 2 ====
In Scala 2, an ADT may be defined with:

sealed abstract class Tree extends Product with Serializable

object Tree {
  final case object Empty extends Tree
  final case class Node(value: Int, left: Tree, right: Tree)
      extends Tree
}

And instantiated as:

val myTree = Tree.Node(
  42,
  Tree.Node(0, Tree.Empty, Tree.Empty),
  Tree.Empty
)

==== Scala 3 ====
In Scala 3, an ADT may be defined with:

enum Tree:
  case Empty
  case Node(value: Int, left: Tree, right: Tree)

And instantiated as:

val myTree = Tree.Node(
  42,
  Tree.Node(0, Tree.Empty, Tree.Empty),
  Tree.Empty
)

=== Standard ML ===
In Standard ML, an ADT may be defined with:

datatype tree =
    EMPTY
  | NODE of int * tree * tree

And instantiated as:

val myTree = NODE (42, NODE (0, EMPTY, EMPTY), EMPTY)

=== Swift ===
In Swift, an ADT may be defined with:

enum Tree {
    case empty
    indirect case node(Int, Tree, Tree)
}

And instantiated as:

let myTree: Tree = .node(42, .node(0, .empty, .empty), .empty)

=== TypeScript ===
In TypeScript, an ADT may be defined with:

type Tree =
  | { kind: "empty" }
  | { kind: "node"; value: number; left: Tree; right: Tree };

And instantiated as:

const myTree: Tree = {
  kind: "node",
  value: 42,
  left: {
    kind: "node",
    value: 0,
    left: { kind: "empty" },
    right: { kind: "empty" },
  },
  right: { kind: "empty" },
};

=== Visual Prolog ===
In Visual Prolog, an ADT may be defined with:

domains
    tree = empty; node(integer, tree, tree).

And instantiated as:

constants
    my_tree : tree = node(42, node(0, empty, empty), empty).

=== Zig ===
In Zig, an ADT may be defined with:

const Tree = union(enum) {
    empty,
    node: struct {
        value: i32,
        left: *const Tree,
        right: *const Tree,
    },
};

And instantiated as:

const my_tree: Tree = .{ .node = .{
    .value = 42,
    .left = &.{ .node = .{
        .value = 0,
        .left = &.empty,
        .right = &.empty,
    } },
    .right = &.empty,
} };
