= Martin Hyland =

British mathematician

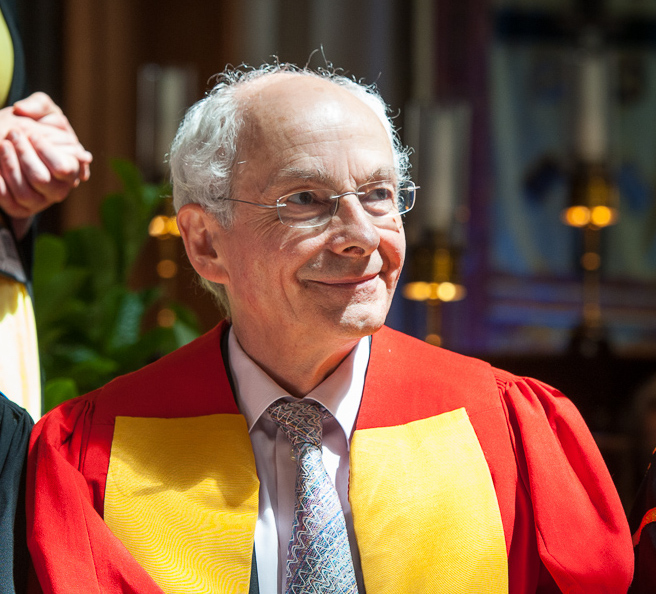
- Born: John Martin Elliott Hyland
- Education: University of Oxford (DPhil)
- Scientific career
- Fields: Mathematics; Theoretical computer science
- Workplaces: University of Cambridge
- Thesis: Recursion Theory on the Countable Functionals (1975)
- Doctoral advisor: Robin Gandy
- Doctoral students: Eugenia Cheng; Valeria de Paiva; Tom Leinster
- Website: www.dpmms.cam.ac.uk/~martin/

(John) Martin Elliott Hyland is professor of mathematical logic at the University of Cambridge and a fellow of King's College, Cambridge. His interests include mathematical logic, category theory, and theoretical computer science.

== Education ==
Hyland was educated at the University of Oxford where he was awarded a Doctor of Philosophy degree in 1975 for research supervised by Robin Gandy.

== Research and career ==
Martin Hyland is best known for his work on category theory applied to logic (proof theory, recursion theory), theoretical computer science (lambda-calculus and semantics) and higher-dimensional algebra. In particular he is known for work on the effective topos (within topos theory) and on game semantics. His former doctoral students include Eugenia Cheng and Valeria de Paiva.

The University of Bath awarded Hyland an Honorary Doctorate of Science in June 2015.
