= Proof net =

In proof theory, proof nets are a geometrical method of representing proofs that eliminates two forms of bureaucracy that differentiate proofs: (A) irrelevant syntactical features of regular proof calculi, and (B) the order of rules applied in a derivation. In this way, the formal properties of proof identity correspond more closely to the intuitively desirable properties. This distinguishes proof nets from regular proof calculi such as the natural deduction calculus and the sequent calculus, where these phenomena are present. Proof nets were introduced by Jean-Yves Girard.

As an illustration, these two linear logic proofs are identical:

$\vdash$ A, B, C, D $\vdash$ A ⅋ B, C, D $\vdash$ A ⅋ B, C ⅋ D	$\vdash$ A, B, C, D $\vdash$ A, B, C ⅋ D $\vdash$ A ⅋ B, C ⅋ D

And their corresponding nets will be the same.

== Correctness criteria ==
Several correctness criteria are known to check if a sequential proof structure (i.e. something that seems to be a proof net) is actually a concrete proof structure (i.e. something that encodes a valid derivation in linear logic). The first such criterion is the long-trip criterion, which was described by Jean-Yves Girard.

== See also ==
- Linear logic
- Ludics
- Geometry of interaction
- Coherent space
- Deep inference
- Interaction nets

== Sources ==
- Proofs and Types. Girard J-Y, Lafont Y, and Taylor P. Cambridge Press, 1989.
- Roberto Di Cosmo and Vincent Danos, The Linear Logic Primer
- Sean A. Fulop, A survey of proof nets and matrices for substructural logics
