= Nobuko Yoshida =

- Born: Nagano, Japan
- Education: Keio University & University of Manchester
- Known for: Multiparty Session Types, theory of concurrent and mobile calculi
- Awards: EPSRC Established Career Fellow (2020); Honorary Fellow, University of Glasgow
- Scientific career
- Fields: Computer science
- Workplaces: Imperial College London; University of Oxford
- Thesis: A Study of Behavioural Semantics for Concurrent Calculi (1996)
- Doctoral advisor: Mario Tokoro & Cliff Jones

Nobuko Yoshida (吉田 展子, Yoshida Nobuko) FBCS is the Christopher Strachey Professor of Computing in the Department of Computer Science, University of Oxford.

Yoshida undertook her BSc (1992) and MSc (1994) at the Keio University, Japan, before completing her PhD (1996) jointly at the universities of Keio and Manchester. She has worked at Imperial College London and the University of Oxford.

Her research interests include mobile concurrent computation, mobile computation and web services.

== Awards ==
She was awarded the title of an EPSRC Established Career Fellow from in 2020 and is also an Honorary Fellow at the University of Glasgow as well as a Fellow of British Computer Society.
