= System T =

In mathematics, System T can refer to:

- A theory of arithmetic in all finite types used in Gödel's Dialectica interpretation
- An axiom system of modal logic
