= Dialectica interpretation =

Arithmetical concept

In proof theory, the Dialectica interpretation is a proof interpretation of intuitionistic logic (Heyting arithmetic) into a finite type extension of primitive recursive arithmetic, the so-called System T. It was developed by Kurt Gödel to provide a consistency proof of arithmetic. The name of the interpretation comes from the journal Dialectica, where Gödel's paper was published in a 1958 special issue dedicated to Paul Bernays on his 70th birthday.

== Motivation ==
Via the Gödel–Gentzen negative translation, the consistency of classical Peano arithmetic had already been reduced to the consistency of intuitionistic Heyting arithmetic. Gödel's motivation for developing the dialectica interpretation was to obtain a relative consistency proof for Heyting arithmetic (and hence for Peano arithmetic).

== Intuitionistic logic ==
The interpretation has two components: a formula translation and a proof translation. The formula translation describes how each formula $A$ of Heyting arithmetic is mapped to a quantifier-free formula $A_D(x; y)$ of the system T, where $x$ and $y$ are tuples of fresh variables (not appearing free in $A$). Intuitively, $A$ is interpreted as $\exists x \forall y A_D(x; y)$. The proof translation shows how a proof of $A$ has enough information to witness the interpretation of $A$, i.e. the proof of $A$ can be converted into a closed term $t$ and a proof of $A_D(t; y)$ in the system T.

=== Formula translation ===
The quantifier-free formula $A_D(x; y)$ is defined inductively on the logical structure of $A$ as follows, where $P$ is an atomic formula:

$$\begin{array}{lcl}
(P)_D & \equiv & P \\
(A \wedge B)_D(x, v; y, w) & \equiv & A_D(x; y) \wedge B_D(v; w) \\
(A \vee B)_D(x, v, z; y, w) & \equiv & (z = 0 \rightarrow A_D(x; y)) \wedge (z \neq 0 \to B_D(v; w)) \\
(A \rightarrow B)_D(f, g; x, w) & \equiv & A_D(x; f x w) \rightarrow B_D(g x; w) \\
(\exists z A)_D(x, z; y) & \equiv & A_D(x; y) \\
(\forall z A)_D(f; y, z) & \equiv & A_D(f z; y)
\end{array}$$

=== Proof translation (soundness) ===
The formula interpretation is such that whenever $A$ is provable in Heyting arithmetic then there exists a sequence of closed terms $t$ such that $A_D(t; y)$ is provable in the system T. The sequence of terms $t$ and the proof of $A_D(t; y)$ are constructed from the given proof of $A$ in Heyting arithmetic. The construction of $t$ is quite straightforward, except for the contraction axiom $A \rightarrow A \wedge A$ which requires the assumption that quantifier-free formulas are decidable.

=== Characterisation principles ===
It has also been shown that Heyting arithmetic extended with the following principles

- Axiom of choice
- Markov's principle
- Independence of premise for universal formulas

is necessary and sufficient for characterising the formulas of HA which are interpretable by the Dialectica interpretation. The choice axiom here is formulated for any 2-ary predicate in the premise and an existence claim with a variable of function type in its conclusion.

=== Extensions ===
The basic dialectica interpretation of intuitionistic logic has been extended to various stronger systems. Intuitively, the dialectica interpretation can be applied to a stronger system, as long as the dialectica interpretation of the extra principle can be witnessed by terms in the system T (or an extension of system T).

==== Induction ====
Given Gödel's incompleteness theorem (which implies that the consistency of PA cannot be proven by finitistic means) it is reasonable to expect that system T must contain non-finitistic constructions. Indeed, this is the case. The non-finitistic constructions show up in the interpretation of mathematical induction. To give a Dialectica interpretation of induction, Gödel makes use of what is nowadays called Gödel's primitive recursive functionals, which are higher-order functions with primitive recursive descriptions.

==== Classical logic ====
Formulas and proofs in classical arithmetic can also be given a Dialectica interpretation via an initial embedding into Heyting arithmetic followed by the Dialectica interpretation of Heyting arithmetic. Shoenfield, in his book, combines the negative translation and the Dialectica interpretation into a single interpretation of classical arithmetic.

==== Comprehension ====
In 1962 Spector extended Gödel's Dialectica interpretation of arithmetic to full mathematical analysis, by showing how the schema of countable choice can be given a Dialectica interpretation by extending system T with bar recursion.

== Linear logic ==
The Dialectica interpretation has been used to build a model of Girard's refinement of intuitionistic logic known as linear logic, via the so-called Dialectica spaces. Since linear logic is a refinement of intuitionistic logic, the dialectica interpretation of linear logic can also be viewed as a refinement of the dialectica interpretation of intuitionistic logic.

Although the linear interpretation in Shirahata's work validates the weakening rule (it is actually an interpretation of affine logic), de Paiva's dialectica spaces interpretation does not validate weakening for arbitrary formulas.

== Variants ==
Several variants of the Dialectica interpretation have been proposed since, most notably the Diller-Nahm variant (to avoid the contraction problem) and Kohlenbach's monotone and Ferreira-Oliva bounded interpretations (to interpret weak Kőnig's lemma). Comprehensive treatments of the interpretation can be found at, and.
