= Primitive recursive functional =

In mathematical logic, the primitive recursive functionals are a generalization of primitive recursive functions into higher type theory. They consist of a collection of functions in all pure finite types.

The primitive recursive functionals are important in proof theory and constructive mathematics. They are a central part of the Dialectica interpretation of intuitionistic arithmetic developed by Kurt Gödel.

In recursion theory, the primitive recursive functionals are an example of higher-type computability, as primitive recursive functions are examples of Turing computability.

== Background ==
Every primitive recursive functional has a type, which says what kind of inputs it takes and what kind of output it produces. An object of type 0 is simply a natural number; it can also be viewed as a constant function that takes no input and returns an output in the set N of natural numbers.

For any two types σ and τ, the type σ→τ represents a function that takes an input of type σ and returns an output of type τ. Thus the function f(n) = n+1 is of type 0→0. The types (0→0)→0 and 0→(0→0) are different; by convention, the notation 0→0→0 refers to 0→(0→0). In the jargon of type theory, objects of type 0→0 are called functions and objects that take inputs of type other than 0 are called functionals.

For any two types σ and τ, the type σ×τ represents an ordered pair, the first element of which has type σ and the second element of which has type τ. For example, consider the functional A takes as inputs a function f from N to N, and a natural number n, and returns f(n). Then A has type (0 × (0→0))→0. This type can also be written as 0→(0→0)→0, by currying.

The set of (pure) finite types is the smallest collection of types that includes 0 and is closed under the operations of × and →. A superscript is used to indicate that a variable x^{τ} is assumed to have a certain type τ; the superscript may be omitted when the type is clear from context.

== Definition ==
The primitive recursive functionals are the smallest collection of objects of finite type such that:

- The constant function f(n) = 0 is a primitive recursive functional
- The successor function g(n) = n + 1 is a primitive recursive functional
- For any type σ×τ, the functional K(x^{σ}, y^{τ}) = x is a primitive recursive functional
- For any types ρ, σ, τ, the functional
  S(r^{ρ→σ→τ},s^{ρ→σ}, t^{ρ}) = (r(t))(s(t))
  is a primitive recursive functional
- For any type τ, and f of type τ, and any g of type 0→τ→τ, the functional R(f,g)^{0→τ} defined recursively as
  R(f,g)(0) = f,
  R(f,g)(n+1) = g(n,R(f,g)(n))
  is a primitive recursive functional

== See also ==
- Dialectica interpretation
- Higher-order function
- Primitive recursive function
- Simply typed lambda calculus
