= Charles Wells (mathematician) =

American mathematician

Charles Frederick Wells (4 May 1937 in Atlanta, Georgia – 17 June 2017) was an American mathematician known for his fundamental contributions to category theory. He was Professor Emeritus of Mathematics at Case Western Reserve University.

Wells taught there for about 35 years, with sabbatical interruptions at ETH Zürich (in mathematics) and Oxford University (in computing science). He had a research career in mathematics in finite fields, group theory and category theory. In the last twenty years of this life he had also been interested in the language of mathematics and related issues concerning teaching and communicating abstract ideas.

== Publications ==
In addition to his scholarly publications, Wells produced A Handbook of Mathematical Discourse, which is a dictionary of words and concepts used by mathematicians that are easily misunderstood, explained in a way that laypersons can also appreciate.

As a life-long shape note singer, in 2002 Wells jointly compiled a tunebook called Oberlin Harmony, which included some of his own compositions.

=== Books ===
- Barr, Michael; Wells, Charles (1985), "Toposes, Triples and Theories" (PDF), Grundlehren der mathematischen Wissenschaften, vol. 278, Springer-Verlag, ISBN 0-387-96115-1.
- Michael Barr and Charles Wells: Category Theory for Computing Science (1999).
- Wells, Charles (2003), A Handbook of Mathematical Discourse, Infinity Publishing, ISBN 0-7414-1685-9.

=== Selected research articles ===
- Wells, Charles (1974), "Polynomials over finite fields which commute with translations", Proceedings of the American Mathematical Society, 46 (3): 347–350, doi:10.1090/S0002-9939-1974-0347785-5

=== Surveys ===
- Sketches (1993) – a survey of the literature on sketches
