= Gaisi Takeuti =

Japanese mathematician (1926–2017)

- 竹内 外史
- Born: January 25, 1926; Kizu, Ishikawa, Japan
- Died: May 10, 2017 (aged 91)
- Education: Tokyo University
- Known for: Work in proof theory
- Scientific career
- Fields: Mathematics
- Workplaces: Institute for Advanced Study; University of Illinois at Urbana–Champaign
- Academic advisors: Kurt Gödel

Gaisi Takeuti (竹内 外史, Takeuchi Gaishi; January 25, 1926 – May 10, 2017) was a Japanese mathematician, known for his work in proof theory.

After graduating from Tokyo University, he went to Princeton to study under Kurt Gödel. He later became a professor at the University of Illinois at Urbana–Champaign. Takeuti was president (2003–2009) of the Kurt Gödel Society, having worked on the book Memoirs of a Proof Theorist: Godel and Other Logicians. His goal was to prove the consistency of the real numbers. To this end, Takeuti's conjecture speculates that a sequent formalisation of second-order logic has cut-elimination. He is also known for his work on ordinal diagrams with Akiko Kino.

== Publications ==
- Takeuti, Gaisi (1953). "On a generalized logic calculus". Japanese Journal of Mathematics. 23: 39–96. doi:10.4099/jjm1924.23.0_39. ISSN 0075-3432.
- Takeuti, Gaisi (1954). "Errata to 'On a Generalized Logic Calculus'". Japanese Journal of Mathematics. 24: 149–156. doi:10.4099/jjm1924.24.0_149. ISSN 0075-3432.
- Takeuti, Gaisi; Zaring, Wilson M. (2011) [1982], Introduction to axiomatic set theory, Graduate Texts in Mathematics, vol. 1 (2nd ed.), New York-Berlin: Springer-Verlag, doi:10.1007/978-1-4613-8168-6, ISBN 978-1-4613-8170-9, MR 0349390
- Takeuti, Gaisi; Zaring, Wilson M. (1973), Axiomatic set theory, Graduate Texts in Mathematics, vol. 8, New York-Berlin: Springer-Verlag, doi:10.1007/978-1-4684-8751-0, ISBN 978-0-387-90050-6, MR 0416914 2013 Dover reprint
- Takeuti, Gaisi (2013) [1975]. Proof theory (Second ed.). Mineola, New York: Dover Publications. ISBN 978-0-486-49073-1.
- Takeuti, Gaisi (2015) [1978], Two applications of logic to mathematics, Publications of the Mathematical Society of Japan, vol. 13, Princeton, N.J.: Princeton University Press, ISBN 978-0-69-161022-1, MR 0505474
- Takeuti, Gaisi (2003) [1998], Memoirs of a proof theorist. Gödel and other logicians, River Edge, NJ: World Scientific Publishing Co., Inc., ISBN 978-981-238-279-5, MR 1984952
