= Michael Barr (mathematician) =

Canadian mathematician and computer scientist

- Born: January 22, 1937 (age 89); Philadelphia, Pennsylvania, U.S.

Academic background
- Education: University of Pennsylvania (BS, PhD)

Academic work
- Discipline: Mathematics
- Sub-discipline: Homological algebra Category theory Theoretical computer science
- Institutions: Columbia University; University of Illinois Urbana-Champaign; McGill University

Michael Barr (born January 22, 1937) is an American mathematician who is the Peter Redpath Emeritus Professor of Pure Mathematics at McGill University.

== Early life and education ==
He was born in Philadelphia, Pennsylvania, and graduated from the 202nd class of Central High School in June 1954. He graduated from the University of Pennsylvania in February 1959 and received a PhD from the same school in June 1962.

== Career ==
Barr studied mathematics at the University of Pennsylvania, graduating with a bachelor's degree in 1959 and a doctorate in 1962 under David Kent Harrison (Cohomology of Commutative Algebras). He was then an instructor at Columbia University and from 1964 Assistant Professor and later Associate Professor at the University of Illinois Urbana-Champaign. In 1968 he became Associate Professor and in 1972 Professor at McGill University.

In 1967 and 1975/76 he was a visiting scientist at ETH Zurich and in 1970/71 at the University of Fribourg and in 1989/90 a visiting professor at the University of Pennsylvania.

In 1970 he was an invited speaker at the International Congress of Mathematicians in Nice (Non-abelian full embedding: outline).

His earlier work was in homological algebra, but his principal research area for a number of years has been category theory. He is well known to theoretical computer scientists for his book Category Theory for Computing Science (1990) with Charles Wells, as well as for the development of *-autonomous categories and Chu spaces which have found various applications in computer science. His monograph *-autonomous categories (1979), and his books Toposes, Triples, and Theories (1985), also coauthored with Wells, and Acyclic Models (2002), are aimed at more specialized audiences. In 2011 Michael Barr and his wife Marcia published an English translation of Grothendieck's fundamental Tôhoku paper.

Barr is on the editorial boards of Mathematical Structures in Computer Science and the electronic journal Homology, Homotopy and Applications, and is editor of the electronic journal Theory and Applications of Categories.
