= Structural rule =

Rule of mathematical logic

In the logical discipline of proof theory, a structural rule is an inference rule of a sequent calculus that does not refer to any logical connective but instead operates on the sequents directly. Structural rules often mimic the intended meta-theoretic properties of the logic. Logics that deny one or more of the structural rules are classified as substructural logics.

== Common structural rules ==
Three common structural rules are:

- Weakening, where the hypotheses or conclusion of a sequence may be extended with additional members. In symbolic form weakening rules can be written as $\frac{\Gamma \vdash \Sigma}{\Gamma, A \vdash \Sigma}$ on the left of the turnstile, and $\frac{\Gamma \vdash \Sigma}{\Gamma \vdash \Sigma, A}$ on the right. Known as monotonicity of entailment in classical logic.
- Contraction, where two equal (or unifiable) members on the same side of a sequent may be replaced by a single member (or common instance). Symbolically: $\frac{\Gamma, A, A \vdash \Sigma}{\Gamma, A \vdash \Sigma}$ and $\frac{\Gamma \vdash A, A, \Sigma}{\Gamma \vdash A, \Sigma}$. Also known as factoring in automated theorem proving systems using resolution. Known as idempotency of entailment in classical logic.
- Exchange, where two members on the same side of a sequent may be swapped. Symbolically: $\frac{\Gamma_1, A, \Gamma_2, B, \Gamma_3 \vdash \Sigma}{\Gamma_1, B, \Gamma_2, A, \Gamma_3 \vdash \Sigma}$ and $\frac{\Gamma \vdash \Sigma_1, A, \Sigma_2, B, \Sigma_3}{\Gamma \vdash \Sigma_1, B, \Sigma_2, A, \Sigma_3}$. (This is also known as the permutation rule.)

A logic without any of the above structural rules would interpret the sides of a sequent as pure sequences; with exchange, they can be considered to be multisets; and with both contraction and exchange they can be considered to be sets.

These are not the only possible structural rules. A famous structural rule is known as cut. Considerable effort is spent by proof theorists in showing that cut rules are superfluous in various logics. More precisely, what is shown is that cut is only (in a sense) a tool for abbreviating proofs, and does not add to the theorems that can be proved. The successful 'removal' of cut rules, known as cut elimination, is directly related to the philosophy of computation as normalization (see Curry–Howard correspondence); it often gives a good indication of the complexity of deciding a given logic.

== See also ==
- Affine logic
- Linear logic – System of resource-aware logic
- Ordered logic (linear logic)
- Relevance logic – Kind of non-classical logic
- Separation logic – Concept in computer science
