= Bar recursion =

Generalized form of recursion

Bar recursion is a generalized form of recursion developed by C. Spector in his 1962 paper. It is related to bar induction in the same fashion that primitive recursion is related to ordinary induction, or transfinite recursion is related to transfinite induction.

== Technical definition ==
Let V, R, and O be types, and i be any natural number, representing a sequence of parameters taken from V. Then the function sequence f of functions f_{n} from V^{i+n} → R to O is defined by bar recursion from the functions L_{n} : R → O and B with B_{n} : ((V^{i+n} → R) x (V^{n} → R)) → O if:

- f_{n}((λα:V^{i+n})r) = L_{n}(r) for any r long enough that L_{n+k} on any extension of r equals L_{n}. Assuming L is a continuous sequence, there must be such r, because a continuous function can use only finitely much data.
- f_{n}(p) = B_{n}(p, (λx:V)f_{n+1}(cat(p, x))) for any p in V^{i+n} → R.

Here "cat" is the concatenation function, sending p, x to the sequence which starts with p, and has x as its last term.

(This definition is based on the one by Escardó and Oliva.)

Provided that for every sufficiently long function (λα)r of type V^{i} → R, there is some n with L_{n}(r) = B_{n}((λα)r, (λx:V)L_{n+1}(r)), the bar induction rule ensures that f is well-defined.

The idea is that one extends the sequence arbitrarily, using the recursion term B to determine the effect, until a sufficiently long node of the tree of sequences over V is reached; then the base term L determines the final value of f. The well-definedness condition corresponds to the requirement that every infinite path must eventually pass through a sufficiently long node: the same requirement that is needed to invoke a bar induction.

The principles of bar induction and bar recursion are the intuitionistic equivalents of the axiom of dependent choices.
