= Monotonicity of entailment =

Property of many systems of logic

Monotonicity of entailment is a property of many logical systems such that if a sentence follows deductively from a given set of sentences then it also follows deductively from any superset of those sentences. A corollary is that if a given argument is deductively valid, it cannot become invalid by the addition of extra premises.

Logical systems with this property are called monotonic logics in order to differentiate them from non-monotonic logics. Classical logic and intuitionistic logic are examples of monotonic logics.

== Weakening rule ==
Monotonicity may be stated formally as a rule called weakening, or sometimes thinning. A system is monotonic if and only if the rule is admissible. The weakening rule may be expressed as a natural deduction sequent:
$$\frac{\Gamma \vdash C}{\Gamma, A \vdash C }$$
This can be read as saying that if, on the basis of a set of assumptions $\Gamma$, one can prove C, then by adding an assumption A, one can still prove C.

== Example ==
The following argument is valid: "All men are mortal. Socrates is a man. Therefore Socrates is mortal." This can be weakened by adding a premise: "All men are mortal. Socrates is a man. Cows produce milk. Therefore Socrates is mortal." By the property of monotonicity, the argument remains valid with the additional premise, even though the premise is irrelevant to the conclusion.

== Non-monotonic logics ==
In most logics, weakening is either an inference rule or a metatheorem if the logic doesn't have an explicit rule. Notable exceptions are:

- Relevance logic, where every premise is necessary for the conclusion.
- Linear logic, which lacks monotonicity and idempotency of entailment.

== See also ==
- Contraction
- Exchange rule
- Substructural logic
- No-cloning theorem
