= Jean-Yves Girard =

French logician (born 1947)

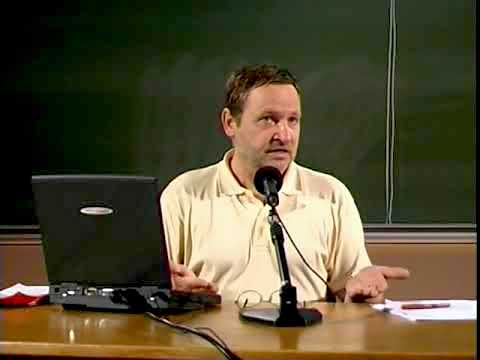
- Born: 1947 (age 78–79); Lyon, France
- Education: École normale supérieure de Saint-Cloud; Paris Diderot University
- Known for: Girard's paradox Coherent space Geometry of interaction Linear logic Ludics; Proof net System F Proof of Takeuti's conjecture
- Awards: Poncelet Prize (1990); CNRS Silver Medal (1983)
- Scientific career
- Fields: Logic
- Workplaces: CNRS
- Doctoral advisor: Jean-Louis Krivine

Jean-Yves Girard (French: [ʒiʁaʁ]; born 1947) is a French logician working in proof theory. He is a research director (emeritus) at the mathematical institute of University of Aix-Marseille, at Luminy.

== Biography ==
Jean-Yves Girard is an alumnus of the École normale supérieure de Saint-Cloud.

He made a name for himself in the 1970s with his proof of strong normalization in a system of second-order logic called System F. This result gave a new proof of Takeuti's conjecture, which was proven a few years earlier by William W. Tait, Motō Takahashi and Dag Prawitz. For this purpose, he introduced the notion of "reducibility candidate" ("candidat de réductibilité"). He is also credited with the discovery of Girard's paradox, linear logic, the geometry of interaction, ludics, and (satirically) the mustard watch.

He obtained the CNRS Silver Medal in 1983 and is a member of the French Academy of Sciences.

== Bibliography ==
- Ernest Nagel; James R. Newman; Kurt Gödel; Jean-Yves Girard (1989). Le théorème de Gödel. Éditions du Seuil.
- Jean-Yves Girard; P. Taylor; Yves Lafont (1989). Proofs and Types. Cambridge University Press.
- Jean-Yves Girard (2007). Le Point Aveugle, Cours de Logique. Hermann.
- Jean-Yves Girard (2011). The Blind Spot: Lectures on Logic
- Jean-Yves Girard (2016). Le fantôme de la transparence. Éditions Allia.

== See also ==
- Affine logic
- Linear logic
