= List of Boolean algebra topics =

This is a list of topics around Boolean algebra and propositional logic.

== Articles with a wide scope and introductions ==
- Algebra of sets
- Boolean algebra (structure)
- Boolean algebra
- Field of sets
- Logical connective
- Propositional calculus

== Boolean functions and connectives ==
- Ampheck
- Analysis of Boolean functions
- Balanced Boolean function
- Bent function
- Boolean algebras canonically defined
- Boolean function
- Boolean matrix
- Boolean-valued function
- Conditioned disjunction
- Evasive Boolean function
- Exclusive or
- Functional completeness
- Logical biconditional
- Logical conjunction
- Logical disjunction
- Logical equality
- Logical implication
- Logical negation
- Logical NOR
- Majority function
- Material conditional
- Minimal axioms for Boolean algebra
- Peirce arrow
- Read-once function
- Sheffer stroke
- Sole sufficient operator
- Symmetric Boolean function
- Symmetric difference
- Zhegalkin polynomial

== Examples of Boolean algebras ==
- Boolean domain
- Complete Boolean algebra
- Interior algebra
- Two-element Boolean algebra

== Extensions of Boolean algebras ==
- Derivative algebra (abstract algebra)
- Free Boolean algebra
- Monadic Boolean algebra

== Generalizations of Boolean algebras ==
- De Morgan algebra
- First-order logic
- Heyting algebra
- Lindenbaum–Tarski algebra
- Skew Boolean algebra

== Syntax ==
- Algebraic normal form
- Boolean conjunctive query
- Canonical form (Boolean algebra)
- Conjunctive normal form
- Disjunctive normal form
- Formal system

== Technical applications ==
- And-inverter graph
- Logic gate
- Boolean analysis

== Theorems and specific laws ==
- Boolean prime ideal theorem
- Compactness theorem
- Consensus theorem
- De Morgan's laws
- Duality (order theory)
- Laws of classical logic
- Peirce's law
- Stone's representation theorem for Boolean algebras

== People ==
- Boole, George
- De Morgan, Augustus
- Jevons, William Stanley
- Peirce, Charles Sanders
- Stone, Marshall Harvey
- Venn, John
- Zhegalkin, Ivan Ivanovich

== Philosophy ==
- Boole's syllogistic
- Boolean implicant
- Entitative graph
- Existential graph
- Laws of Form
- Logical graph

== Visualization ==
- Truth table
- Karnaugh map
- Venn diagram

== Unclassified ==
- Boolean function
- Boolean-valued function
- Boolean-valued model
- Boolean satisfiability problem
- Boolean differential calculus
- Indicator function (also called the characteristic function, but that term is used in probability theory for a different concept)
- Espresso heuristic logic minimizer
- Logical matrix
- Logical value
- Stone duality
- Stone space
- Topological Boolean algebra
