= Logical truth =

Statement that is true regardless of the truth or falsity of its constituent propositions

Logical truth is one of the most fundamental concepts in logic. Broadly speaking, a logical truth is a statement which is true regardless of the truth or falsity of its constituent propositions. In other words, a logical truth is a statement which is not only true, but one which is true under all interpretations of its logical components (other than its logical constants). Thus, logical truths such as "if p, then p" can be considered tautologies. Logical truths are thought to be the simplest case of statements which are analytically true (or in other words, true by definition). All of philosophical logic can be thought of as providing accounts of the nature of logical truth, as well as logical consequence.

Logical truths are generally considered to be necessarily true. This is to say that they are such that no situation could arise in which they could fail to be true. The view that logical statements are necessarily true is sometimes treated as equivalent to saying that logical truths are true in all possible worlds. However, the question of which statements are necessarily true remains the subject of continued debate.

Treating logical truths, analytic truths, and necessary truths as equivalent, logical truths can be contrasted with facts (which can also be called contingent claims or synthetic claims). Contingent truths are true in this world, but could have turned out otherwise (in other words, they are false in at least one possible world). Logically true propositions such as "If p and q, then p" and "All married people are married" are logical truths because they are true due to their internal structure and not because of any facts of the world (whereas "All married people are happy", even if it were true, could not be true solely in virtue of its logical structure).

Rationalist philosophers have suggested that the existence of logical truths cannot be explained by empiricism, because they hold that it is impossible to account for our knowledge of logical truths on empiricist grounds. Empiricists commonly respond to this objection by arguing that logical truths (which they usually deem to be mere tautologies), are analytic and thus do not purport to describe the world. The latter view was notably defended by the logical positivists in the early 20th century.

== Logical truths and analytic truths ==
Logical truths, being analytic statements, do not contain any information about any matters of fact. Other than logical truths, there is also a second class of analytic statements, typified by "no bachelor is married". The characteristic of such a statement is that it can be turned into a logical truth by substituting synonyms for synonyms salva veritate. "No bachelor is married" can be turned into "no unmarried man is married" by substituting "unmarried man" for its synonym "bachelor".

In his essay Two Dogmas of Empiricism, the philosopher W. V. O. Quine called into question the distinction between analytic and synthetic statements. It was this second class of analytic statements that caused him to note that the concept of analyticity itself stands in need of clarification, because it seems to depend on the concept of synonymy, which stands in need of clarification. In his conclusion, Quine rejects that logical truths are necessary truths. Instead he posits that the truth-value of any statement can be changed, including logical truths, given a re-evaluation of the truth-values of every other statement in one's complete theory.

== Truth values and tautologies ==
Considering different interpretations of the same statement leads to the notion of truth value. The simplest approach to truth values means that the statement may be "true" in one case, but "false" in another. In one sense of the term tautology, it is any type of formula or proposition which turns out to be true under any possible interpretation of its terms (may also be called a valuation or assignment depending upon the context). This is synonymous to logical truth.

However, the term tautology is also commonly used to refer to what could more specifically be called truth-functional tautologies. Whereas a tautology or logical truth is true solely because of the logical terms it contains in general (e.g. "every", "some", and "is"), a truth-functional tautology is true because of the logical terms it contains which are logical connectives (e.g. "or", "and", and "nor"). Not all logical truths are tautologies of such a kind.

== Logical truth and logical constants ==
Logical constants, including logical connectives and quantifiers, can all be reduced conceptually to logical truth. For instance, two statements or more are logically incompatible if, and only if their conjunction is logically false. One statement logically implies another when it is logically incompatible with the negation of the other. A statement is logically true if, and only if its opposite is logically false. The opposite statements must contradict one another. In this way all logical connectives can be expressed in terms of preserving logical truth. The logical form of a sentence is determined by its semantic or syntactic structure and by the placement of logical constants. Logical constants determine whether a statement is a logical truth when they are combined with a language that limits its meaning. Therefore, until it is determined how to make a distinction between all logical constants regardless of their language, it is impossible to know the complete truth of a statement or argument.

== Logical truth and rules of inference ==
The concept of logical truth is closely connected to the concept of a rule of inference.

== Logical truth and logical positivism ==
Logical positivism was a movement in the early 20th century that tried to reduce the reasoning processes of science to pure logic. Among other things, the logical positivists claimed that any proposition that is not empirically verifiable is neither true nor false, but nonsense.

== Non-classical logics ==
Non-classical logic is the name given to formal systems which differ in a significant way from standard logical systems such as propositional and predicate logic. There are several ways in which this is done, including by way of extensions, deviations, and variations. The aim of these departures is to make it possible to construct different models of logical consequence and logical truth.

== See also ==
- Contradiction
- False (logic)
- Logical truth table, a mathematical table used in logic
- Satisfiability
- Tautology (logic) (for symbolism of logical truth)
- Theorem
- Validity
