= Validity (logic) =

Argument whose conclusion must be true if its premises are

In logic, specifically in deductive reasoning, an argument is valid if and only if it takes a form that makes it impossible for the premises to be true and the conclusion nevertheless to be false. It is not required for a valid argument to have premises that are actually true, but to have premises that, if they were true, would guarantee the truth of the argument's conclusion. Valid arguments must be clearly expressed by means of sentences called well-formed formulas (also called wffs or simply formulas).

The validity of an argument can be tested, proved or disproved, and depends on its logical form.

== Arguments ==
Argument terminology used in logic

In logic, an argument is a set of related statements expressing the premises (which may consist of non-empirical evidence, empirical evidence or may contain some axiomatic truths) and a necessary conclusion based on the relationship of the premises.

An argument is valid if and only if it would be contradictory for the conclusion to be false if all of the premises are true. Validity does not require the truth of the premises, instead it merely necessitates that conclusion follows from the premises without violating the correctness of the logical form. If also the premises of a valid argument are proven true, this is said to be sound.

The corresponding conditional of a valid argument is a logical truth and the negation of its corresponding conditional is a contradiction. The conclusion is a necessary consequence of its premises.

An argument that is not valid is said to be "invalid".

An example of a valid (and sound) argument is given by the following well-known syllogism:

All men are mortal. (True)
Socrates is a man. (True)
Therefore, Socrates is mortal. (True)

What makes this a valid argument is not that it has true premises and a true conclusion. Validity is about the tie in relationship between the two premises the necessity of the conclusion. There needs to be a relationship established between the premises i.e., a middle term between the premises. If you just have two unrelated premises there is no argument. Notice some of the terms repeat: men is a variation man in premises one and two, Socrates and the term mortal repeats in the conclusion. The argument would be just as valid if both premises and conclusion were false. The following argument is of the same logical form but with false premises and a false conclusion, and it is equally valid:

All cups are green. (False)
Socrates is a cup. (False)
Therefore, Socrates is green. (False)

No matter how the universe might be constructed, it could never be the case that these arguments should turn out to have simultaneously true premises but a false conclusion. The above arguments may be contrasted with the following invalid one:

All men are immortal. (False)
Socrates is a man. (True)
Therefore, Socrates is mortal. (True)

In this case, the conclusion contradicts the deductive logic of the preceding premises, rather than deriving from it. Therefore, the argument is logically 'invalid', even though the conclusion could be considered 'true' in general terms. The premise 'All men are immortal' would likewise be deemed false outside of the framework of classical logic. However, within that system 'true' and 'false' essentially function more like mathematical states such as binary 1s and 0s than the philosophical concepts normally associated with those terms. Formal arguments that are invalid are often associated with at least one fallacy which should be verifiable.

A standard view is that whether an argument is valid is a matter of the argument's logical form. Many techniques are employed by logicians to represent an argument's logical form. A simple example, applied to two of the above illustrations, is the following: Let the letters 'P', 'Q', and 'S' stand, respectively, for the set of men, the set of mortals, and Socrates. Using these symbols, the first argument may be abbreviated as:

All P are Q.
S is a P.
Therefore, S is a Q.

Similarly, the third argument becomes:

All P's are not Q.
S is a P.
Therefore, S is a Q.

An argument is termed formally valid if it has structural self-consistency, i.e. if when the operands between premises are all true, the derived conclusion is always also true. In the third example, the initial premises cannot logically result in the conclusion and is therefore categorized as an invalid argument.

== Valid formula ==
A formula of a formal language is a valid formula if and only if it is true under every possible interpretation of the language. In propositional logic, they are tautologies.

== Statements ==
A statement can be called valid, i.e. logical truth, in some systems of logic like in modal logic if the statement is true in all interpretations. In Aristotelian logic statements are not valid per se. Validity refers to entire arguments. The same is true in propositional logic (statements can be true or false but not called valid or invalid).

== Soundness ==
Validity of deduction is not affected by the truth of the premise or the truth of the conclusion. The following deduction is perfectly valid:

All animals live on Mars. (False)
All humans are animals. (True)
Therefore, all humans live on Mars. (False)

The problem with the argument is that it is not sound. In order for a deductive argument to be sound, the argument must be valid and all the premises must be true.

== Satisfiability ==
Model theory analyzes formulae with respect to particular classes of interpretation in suitable mathematical structures. On this reading, a formula is valid if all such interpretations make it true. An inference is valid if all interpretations that validate the premises validate the conclusion. This is known as semantic validity.

== Preservation ==
In truth-preserving validity, the interpretation under which all variables are assigned a truth value of 'true' produces a truth value of 'true'.

In a false-preserving validity, the interpretation under which all variables are assigned a truth value of 'false' produces a truth value of 'false'.

Preservation properties	Logical connective sentences
True and false preserving:	Proposition • Logical conjunction (AND, $\land$ ) • Logical disjunction (OR, $\lor$ )
True preserving only:	Tautology ( $\top$ ) • Biconditional (XNOR, $\leftrightarrow$ ) • Implication ( $\rightarrow$ ) • Converse implication ( $\leftarrow$ )
False preserving only:	Contradiction ( $\bot$ ) • Exclusive disjunction (XOR, $\oplus$ ) • Nonimplication ( $\nrightarrow$ ) • Converse nonimplication ( $\nleftarrow$ )
Non-preserving:	Negation ( $\neg$ ) • Alternative denial (NAND, $\uparrow$ ) • Joint denial (NOR, $\downarrow$ )

== See also ==
- Logical consequence
- Reductio ad absurdum
- Mathematical fallacy
- Soundness
- Ω-validity
