= Bochenski =

Bochenski may refer to:

In people:

- Brandon Bochenski (born 1982), American ice hockey player and politician
- Józef Maria Bocheński (1902–1995), Polish philosopher and logician

In places:

- Bochnia County, (Polish: powiat bocheński), Poland
