= Czuszów =

- Village
- Location within Poland
- Coordinates: 50°15′N 20°21′E
- Country: Poland
- Voivodeship: Lesser Poland
- County: Proszowice
- Gmina: Pałecznica
- Population: 706

Czuszów [ˈt͡ʂuʂuf] is a village in the administrative district of Gmina Pałecznica, within Proszowice County, Lesser Poland Voivodeship, in southern Poland.

Czuszów is the birthplace of Dominican, logician and philosopher Józef Maria Bocheński (1902 – 1995).
