= Henry M. Sheffer =

American logician (1882–1964)

Henry Maurice Sheffer (1 September 1882 – 17 March 1964) was an American logician.

== Life and career ==
Sheffer was a Polish Jew born in Odessa who immigrated to the U.S. in 1892 with his parents and six siblings. He studied at the Boston Latin School before entering Harvard University, learning logic from Josiah Royce, and completing his undergraduate degree in 1905, his master's in 1907, and his Ph.D. in philosophy under Royce in 1908.

Sheffer was a postdoctoral fellow at Harvard, and then taught at the University of Washington, Cornell University, the University of Minnesota, the University of Missouri, and City College of New York for one year each. In 1916, he was hired by Harvard as a philosophy professor, where he stayed until he retired in 1952. Scanlan (2000) is a study of Sheffer's life and work.

Sheffer proved in 1913 that Boolean algebra could be defined using a single primitive binary operation, "not both . . . and . . .", now abbreviated NAND, or its dual NOR, (in the sense of "neither . . . nor"). Likewise, the propositional calculus could be formulated using a single connective, having the truth table either of the logical NAND, usually symbolized with a vertical line called the Sheffer stroke, or its dual logical NOR (usually symbolized with a vertical arrow or with a dagger symbol). Charles Peirce had also discovered these facts in 1880, but the relevant paper was not published until 1933. Sheffer also proposed axioms formulated solely in terms of his stroke. (Note: Henry Maurice Sheffer (1913). "A Set of Five Independent Postulates for Boolean Algebras, with Application to Logical Constants". Transactions of the American Mathematical Society. 14 (4). American Mathematical Society: 481–488. doi:10.2307/1988701. JSTOR 1988701. Presented to the Society 13 December 1912.)

Sheffer introduced what is now known as the Sheffer stroke in 1913; it became well known only after its use in the 1925 edition of Whitehead and Russell's Principia Mathematica. Sheffer's discovery won great praise from Bertrand Russell, who used it extensively to simplify his own logic, in the second edition of his Principia Mathematica. Because of this comment, Sheffer was something of a mystery man to logicians, especially because Sheffer, who published little in his career, never published the details of this method, only describing it in mimeographed notes and in a brief published abstract. W. V. Quine's Mathematical Logic also made much of the Sheffer stroke. A Sheffer connective, subsequently, is any connective in a logical system that functions analogously: one in terms of which all other possible connectives in the language can be expressed. For example, they have been developed for quantificational and modal logics as well.

Sheffer died in Boston.

== Sources ==
- Scanlan, Michael, 2000, "The Known and Unknown H. M. Sheffer," The Transactions of the C.S. Peirce Society 36: 193–224.
- Rosen, Kenneth, 2005, "Discrete Mathematics and its Applications" The Foundations: Logic and Proofs 1: 28.
