= Converse nonimplication =

Logical connective

Venn diagram of $P \nleftarrow Q$ (the red area is true)

In logic, converse nonimplication is a logical connective which is the negation of converse implication (equivalently, the negation of the converse of implication).

== Definition ==
Converse nonimplication is notated $P \nleftarrow Q$, or $P \not \subset Q$, and is logically equivalent to $\neg (P \leftarrow Q)$ and $\neg P \wedge Q$.

=== Truth table ===
The truth table of $A \nleftarrow B$.

$A$	$B$	$A \nleftarrow B$
F	F	F
F	T	T
T	F	F
T	T	F

== Notation ==
Converse nonimplication is notated $p \nleftarrow q$, which is the left arrow from converse implication ($\leftarrow$), negated with a stroke (/).

Alternatives include

- $p \not\subset q$, which combines converse implication's $\subset$, negated with a stroke (/).
- $p \tilde{\leftarrow} q$, which combines converse implication's left arrow ($\leftarrow$) with negation's tilde ($\sim$).
- Mpq, in Bocheński notation

== Properties ==
falsehood-preserving: The interpretation under which all variables are assigned a truth value of 'false' produces a truth value of 'false' as a result of converse nonimplication

== Natural language ==
=== Grammatical ===
Example,

If it rains (P) then I get wet (Q), just because I am wet (Q) does not mean it is raining, in reality I went to a pool party with the co-ed staff, in my clothes (~P) and that is why I am facilitating this lecture in this state (Q).

=== Rhetorical ===
Q does not imply P.

=== Colloquial ===
Not P, but Q.

== Boolean algebra ==
Converse nonimplication in a general Boolean algebra is defined as $q \nleftarrow p=q'p$.

Example of a 2-element Boolean algebra: the 2 elements {0,1} with 0 as zero and 1 as unity element, operators $\sim$ as complement operator, $\vee$ as join operator and $\wedge$ as meet operator, build the Boolean algebra of propositional logic.

${}\sim x$	1	0
x	0	1

(Negation)
and

y			
1	1	1	
0	0	1	
$y_\vee x$	0	1	x

(Inclusive or)
and

y			
1	0	1	
0	0	0	
$y_\wedge x$	0	1	x

(And)
then $\scriptstyle{y \nleftarrow x}\!$ means

y			
1	0	0	
0	0	1	
$\scriptstyle{y \nleftarrow x}\!$	0	1	x

(Converse nonimplication)

Example of a 4-element Boolean algebra: the 4 divisors {1,2,3,6} of 6 with 1 as zero and 6 as unity element, operators $\scriptstyle{ ^{c}}\!$ (co-divisor of 6) as complement operator, $\scriptstyle{_\vee}\!$ (least common multiple) as join operator and $\scriptstyle{_\wedge}\!$ (greatest common divisor) as meet operator, build a Boolean algebra.

$\scriptstyle{x^c}\!$	6	3	2	1
x	1	2	3	6

(Co-divisor 6)
and

y					
6	6	6	6	6	
3	3	6	3	6	
2	2	2	6	6	
1	1	2	3	6	
$\scriptstyle{y_\vee x}\!$	1	2	3	6	x

(Least common multiple)
and

y					
6	1	2	3	6	
3	1	1	3	3	
2	1	2	1	2	
1	1	1	1	1	
$\scriptstyle{y_\wedge x}$	1	2	3	6	x

(Greatest common divisor)
then $\scriptstyle{y \nleftarrow x}\!$ means

y					
6	1	1	1	1	
3	1	2	1	2	
2	1	1	3	3	
1	1	2	3	6	
$\scriptstyle{y \nleftarrow x}\!$	1	2	3	6	x

(x's greatest divisor coprime with y)

=== Properties ===
==== Non-associative ====
$r \nleftarrow (q \nleftarrow p) = (r \nleftarrow q) \nleftarrow p$ if and only if $rp = 0$ #s5 (In a two-element Boolean algebra the latter condition is reduced to $r = 0$ or $p=0$). Hence in a nontrivial Boolean algebra converse nonimplication is nonassociative.
$$\begin{align}
(r \nleftarrow q) \nleftarrow p
&= r'q \nleftarrow p & \text{(by definition)} \\
&= (r'q)'p & \text{(by definition)} \\
&= (r + q')p & \text{(De Morgan's laws)} \\
&= (r + r'q')p & \text{(Absorption law)} \\
&= rp + r'q'p \\
&= rp + r'(q \nleftarrow p) & \text{(by definition)} \\
&= rp + r \nleftarrow (q \nleftarrow p) & \text{(by definition)} \\
\end{align}$$

Clearly, it is associative if and only if $rp=0$.

==== Non-commutative ====
- $q \nleftarrow p=p \nleftarrow q$ if and only if $q = p$ #s6. Hence converse nonimplication is noncommutative.

==== Neutral and absorbing elements ====
- 0 is a left neutral element ($0 \nleftarrow p=p$) and a right absorbing element (${p \nleftarrow 0=0}$).
- $1 \nleftarrow p=0$, $p \nleftarrow 1=p'$, and $p \nleftarrow p=0$.
- Implication $q \rightarrow p$ is the dual of converse nonimplication $q \nleftarrow p$ #s7.

Converse nonimplication is noncommutative
Step	Make use of	Resulting in
s.1	Definition	$\scriptstyle{q\tilde{\leftarrow}p=q'p\,}\!$
s.2	Definition	$\scriptstyle{p\tilde{\leftarrow}q=p'q\,}\!$
s.3	s.1 s.2	$\scriptstyle{q\tilde{\leftarrow}p=p\tilde{\leftarrow}q\ \Leftrightarrow\ q'p=qp'\,}\!$
s.4		$\scriptstyle{q\,}\!$	$\scriptstyle{=\,}\!$	$\scriptstyle{q.1\,}\!$
s.5	s.4.right - expand Unit element		$\scriptstyle{=\,}\!$	$\scriptstyle{q.(p+p')\,}\!$
s.6	s.5.right - evaluate expression		$\scriptstyle{=\,}\!$	$\scriptstyle{qp+qp'\,}\!$
s.7	s.4.left = s.6.right	$\scriptstyle{q=qp+qp'\,}\!$
s.8		$\scriptstyle{q'p=qp'\,}\!$	$\scriptstyle{\Rightarrow\,}\!$	$\scriptstyle{qp+qp'=qp+q'p\,}\!$
s.9	s.8 - regroup common factors		$\scriptstyle{\Rightarrow\,}\!$	$\scriptstyle{q.(p+p')=(q+q').p\,}\!$
s.10	s.9 - join of complements equals unity		$\scriptstyle{\Rightarrow\,}\!$	$\scriptstyle{q.1=1.p\,}\!$
s.11	s.10.right - evaluate expression		$\scriptstyle{\Rightarrow\,}\!$	$\scriptstyle{q=p\,}\!$
s.12	s.8 s.11	$\scriptstyle{q'p=qp'\ \Rightarrow\ q=p\,}\!$
s.13		$\scriptstyle{q=p\ \Rightarrow\ q'p=qp'\,}\!$
s.14	s.12 s.13	$\scriptstyle{q=p\ \Leftrightarrow\ q'p=qp'\,}\!$
s.15	s.3 s.14	$\scriptstyle{q\tilde{\leftarrow}p=p\tilde{\leftarrow}q\ \Leftrightarrow\ q=p\,}\!$

Implication is the dual of converse nonimplication
Step	Make use of	Resulting in
s.1	Definition	$\scriptstyle{\operatorname{dual}(q\tilde{\leftarrow}p)\,}\!$	$\scriptstyle{=\,}\!$	$\scriptstyle{\operatorname{dual}(q'p)\,}\!$
s.2	s.1.right - .'s dual is +		$\scriptstyle{=\,}\!$	$\scriptstyle{q'+p\,}\!$
s.3	s.2.right - Involution complement		$\scriptstyle{=\,}\!$	$\scriptstyle{(q'+p)''\,}\!$
s.4	s.3.right - De Morgan's laws applied once		$\scriptstyle{=\,}\!$	$\scriptstyle{(qp')'\,}\!$
s.5	s.4.right - Commutative law		$\scriptstyle{=\,}\!$	$\scriptstyle{(p'q)'\,}\!$
s.6	s.5.right		$\scriptstyle{=\,}\!$	$\scriptstyle{(p\tilde{\leftarrow}q)'\,}\!$
s.7	s.6.right		$\scriptstyle{=\,}\!$	$\scriptstyle{p\leftarrow q\,}\!$
s.8	s.7.right		$\scriptstyle{=\,}\!$	$\scriptstyle{q\rightarrow p\,}\!$
s.9	s.1.left = s.8.right	$\scriptstyle{\operatorname{dual}(q\tilde{\leftarrow}p)=q\rightarrow p\,}\!$

== Computer science ==
An example for converse nonimplication in computer science can be found when performing a right outer join on a set of tables from a database, if records not matching the join-condition from the "left" table are being excluded.
