= Józef Maria Bocheński =

Polish Dominican and philosopher (1902–1995)

The Reverend Józef Maria Bocheński O.P.
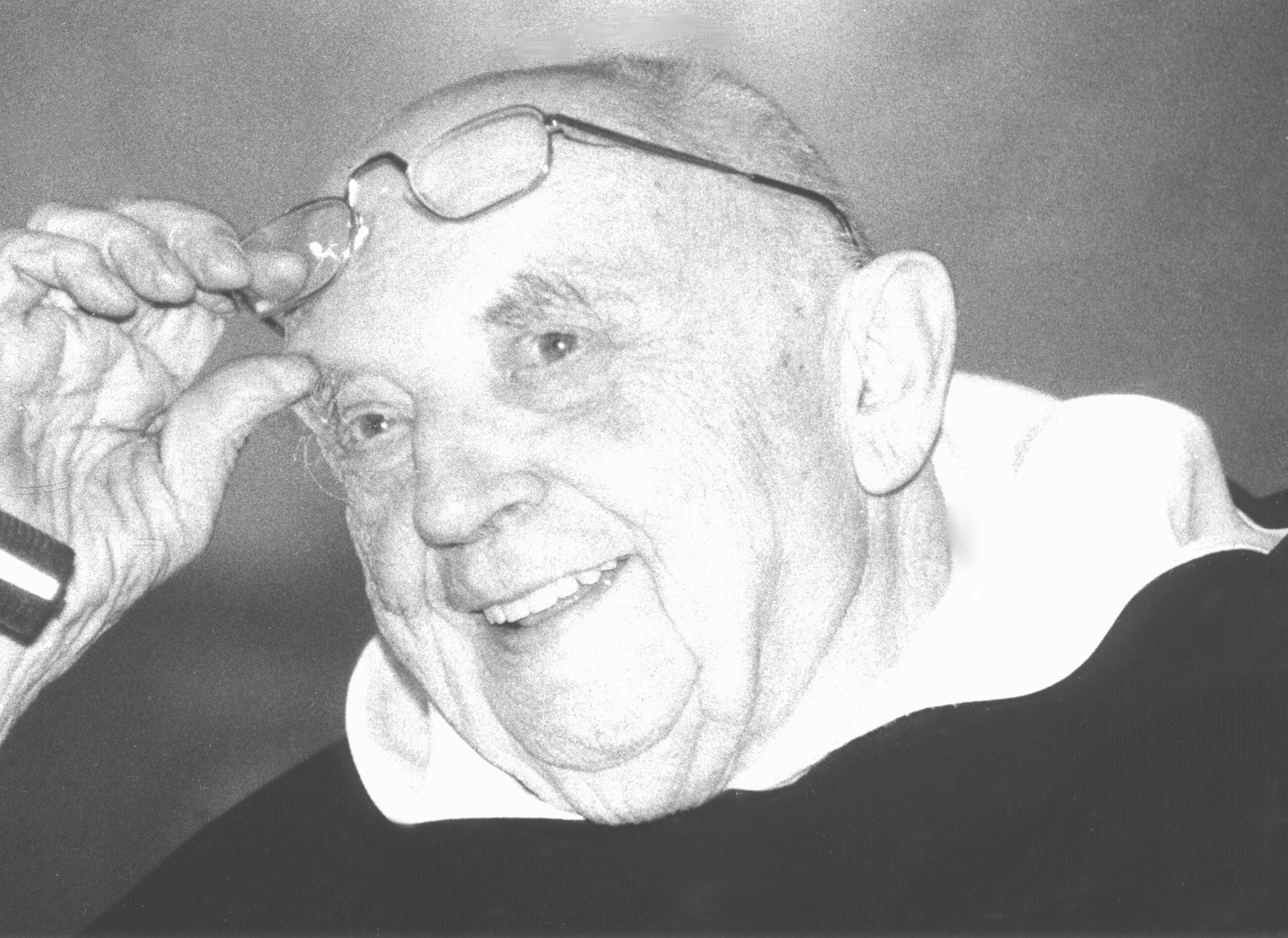
- Born: 30 August 1902; Czuszów, Congress Poland, Russian Empire
- Died: 8 February 1995 (aged 92); Fribourg, Switzerland
- Relatives: Tadeusz (Great-grandfather); Franciszek (Grandfather); Adolf (Father); Maria (Mother); Aleksander (Brother); Olga (Sister); Adolf (Brother)

Philosophical work
- Era: 20th century philosophy
- Region: Western philosophy: Polish philosophy
- School: Analytical Thomism; Cracow Circle
- Institutions: Pontifical University of Saint Thomas Aquinas
- Main interests: Logic; Theology
- Notable ideas: Havelism; Societal democracy

Józef Maria Bocheński (Polish: [bɔˈxɛɲski]; 30 August 1902 – 8 February 1995), in religion Innocentius, was a Polish Dominican priest, logician and philosopher. He was one of the leading representatives of Analytical Thomism and a prominent member of the Cracow Circle. His work combined rigorous formal logic with classical metaphysics. Bocheński taught at the Pontifical University of Saint Thomas Aquinas and later at the University of Fribourg, where he served as rector. He was also known as an influential sovietologist and a critic of Marxism.

== Biography ==
Bocheński was born on 30 August 1902 in Czuszów, then part of the Russian Empire, to a family with patriotic and pro-independence traditions. His predecessors had fought in the Napoleonic wars and various national uprisings.

His father, Adolf Józef Bocheński (1870–1936), who greatly developed the family estate, was a landowning activist, volunteer in the 1919-21 war with the Soviet Union and a doctor of agricultural sciences; his interest in economic history influenced Józef's own reflections on economic doctrine and his personal aversion to Marxism. Józef's mother, Maria Małgorzata née Dunin-Borkowska (1882–1931), was interested in theology, the author of the biographies of St John of the Cross and St Teresa of Jesus and the founder of a parish in Ponikwa. In charge of raising the children, she was known for her rigorous methods of exerting parental control and autocratic character. Józef's father had a more liberal disposition, being primarily interested in his sons becoming good athletes and cavalrymen (he himself having had considerable sports achievements as a horse rider).

Józef had three siblings: Aleksander Adolf Maria Bocheński (1904–2001), journalist and political author, economic and political activist, member of the Legislative Parliament in 1947–1952, member of the PAX Association Board in 1962–1985 as well as an activist of the Patriotic Movement for National Rebirth; Adolf Maria Bocheński (1909––1944), journalist, political author and soldier of the Polish Armed Forces in the West; and Olga Antonina, married name Zawadzka (1905–2008), teacher and author of religious education curricula, awardee of the Righteous Among the Nations medal. Józef was initially taught at home. The tutors taught the boys patriotic songs, military drills and inculcated them with a romantic perception of patriotism. Yet at the same time, they were raised in French culture, with emphasis being placed on logicality and rationalism.

In 1907, the Bocheński family moved from Czuszów in the Kielce region to Ponikwa, a property inherited by Józef's mother, near Brody in Eastern Galicia. Life in this vast estate had a significant impact on the siblings, who had been taught to cherish the tradition of eastern borderland (Kresy) peoples. The brothers had been politicised since early childhood, and now they argued among themselves the validity Roman Dmowski's concepts. The topic was so hotly disputed that the parents felt obliged to ban such discussions at the dinner table, all the more so because Józef was quite favourably disposed to the national camp, whereas his father regarded National Democrats to be ‘a mentality rather than a political party’.

The First World War, with several evacuations and returns to Ponikwa on account of its proximity to the frontline, led to the family's drastic impoverishment. They witnessed soldiers’ and workers’ revolts at the time of the Bolshevik Revolution. Their numerous peregrinations also meant that Józef had to frequently change schools, from Tarnów to Warsaw (Konrad Górski School), and then to Lwów (Adam Mickiewicz Gymnasium).

As a sixteen-year-old, Józef Bocheński witnessed Polish-Ukrainian fighting in Lwów, but his parents did not allow him to participate. After graduating from high school in 1920, he volunteered to join the 8th Uhlan Regiment and saw action in the Battle of Komarów. These war experiences reaffirmed his conviction that defensive warfare was a justified means of conducting national politics. He studied law at the University of Lwów in 1920–1922, and then political economy at the University of Poznań in 1922–1926. However, he was not attracted to studying as much as to other aspects of student life. In the academic year 1924/1925, he was president of the university's Brotherly Aid Association, and was also active in the Corona Academic Corporation as well as the Monarchist Organization, of which he was president in 1926. The views that Bocheński then espoused could be perceived as leaning towards the ideals of National Democracy – though he later reflected that in his youth for a time he considered himself to be an anarchist. In the student press, he actively condemned the May Coup and took part in anti-Piłsudski demonstrations. (His brothers, by contrast, were fervent supporters of the Marshal.)

In 1926, Józef came to the conclusion that he faced a completely wasted life. Feeling that he was no longer a Christian, a Catholic or even a person of faith, he broke his engagement with Maria Franciszka Bocheńska (his cousin) and entered a seminary. He did this to discipline his exuberant personality in an institution whose feudal, anti-democratic nature, by his own admission, he found attractive. According to Włodzimierz Sznarbachowski, a close acquaintance, that was also the intention of Józef's autocratic mother, Maria Bocheńska, who understood well her oldest son's character (just as she felt her youngest son should become a diplomat, and Alexander, a natural-born farmer, should be allowed to marry). Another major influence on Józef's choice was Friar Jacek Woroniecki, who helped him to become interested in Thomism.

From 25 June 1926 to 3 July 1927, Józef was a seminarian at the Poznań Theological Seminary. There he experienced conversion and developed fascination with Christian philosophy. Joining a religious order was, in Józef's mind, an essential consequence of his choice and after lengthy considerations of the qualities of the Jesuit, Franciscan, Dominican and Benedictine orders, he decided to join the Dominicans. He made his noviciate the Kraków Dominican monastery from October 1927 to October 1928. After making a temporary profession of vows on 4 October 1928, against his intention of becoming a missionary, he was told to take up studies in philosophy at Fribourg University, Switzerland, in 1928–1931. He was awarded a doctorate in philosophy on 31 June 1931 (for ‘an idiotic’, in his opinion, thesis on Maurycy Straszewski). In 1931–1933, he studied at the Pontifical University of St Thomas Aquinas (Angelicum) in Rome to become, on 21 March 1934, a doctor of theology (for a thesis entitled Discovering the existence of God through causality and the Catholic faith). On 20 June 1932, he was ordained to the presbyterate. In 1934–1940, he gave lectures on logic at the Angelicum in Rome. He was awarded a habilitation in Christian Philosophy at the Jagiellonian University on 14 March 1938 on the basis of a thesis entitled From the history of the logic of modal sentences. Bocheński's understanding of the supernatural and material spheres was greatly influenced by his attachment to the logical method of thinking, which, in his opinion, inevitably led to recognising the existence of God. The view that faith, being an act of will, was not contrary, but coherent with science and logic was apparent in all his works. In the 1930s, Józef also published articles in Bunt Młodych and Polityka, magazines where his brothers Aleksander and Adolf were leading columnists. Józef's articles primarily concerned philosophical issues, providing in this form a basis for the ‘superpower’ ideology of the two periodicals.

The outbreak of war found him engaged the construction of a religious house in Służewo. On 6 September, he left Warsaw accompanied by National Democrat acquaintances and subsequently joined the 81st Infantry Regiment, where he served as a chaplain. Taken prisoner at Kock, he soon managed to escape and – via Kraków, Katowice and Vienna – eventually reached Italy. There he was involved in helping Polish professors imprisoned by the Germans, and next he got through to Great Britain, where he carried out pastoral work among the Polish exiles and served as a Polish Army education officer. In 1943–1944, he was a lecturer at the Military Academy in Edinburgh. On 16 February 1944, Bishop Józef Gawlina appointed him army chaplain, thanks to which he joined the Polish II Corps, where he met his brother Adolf and participated in the Battle of Monte Cassino (serving on the Italian front from 27 March to 16 July 1944). On 17 August 1944, he was appointed chaplain to Polish Army Headquarters in Rome and head of the army bishop's press office. He held this position until 15 October 1945, in that time authoring many distinctly anti-communist articles as well as serving as editor of the soldiers’ religious press.

In the autumn of that year, he started giving lectures on the history of 20th-century philosophy at the University of Fribourg, and from 1951 also on early modern history. An associate professor from 1945, he became a full professor at the university in 1948. Bocheński continued working at Fribourg until 1973, as dean of the Faculty of Philosophy in 1950-1952, and university rector in 1964-1966. In 1957, he became the director of the Eastern Europe Institute at Fribourg, from 1956 he was also a board member of Kollegium Ost in Cologne, and its director in 1961. In 1960, he received Fribourg citizenship.

Bocheński was visiting professor at the University of Notre Dame in Indiana, the University of Kansas, the University of Cologne, the University of Pittsburgh, the University of Salzburg and Boston College. He was a member of the Council of the International Federation of Philosophical Societies, the founder and secretary of the World Union of Catholic Philosophical Societies as well as the president of the International Federation of Logical and Methodological Societies. He established the Polish Catholic Home in Fribourg in 1952, and also co-founded the Polish Museum Foundation in Rapperswil.

He was awarded honorary doctorates by the University of Notre Dame, USA (1966), the University of Buenos Aires (1977), the University of Milan (1981), as well as the Jagiellonian University and Academy of Theology in Warsaw (1988).

He was the promoter of several dozen doctoral dissertations and author of numerous books on what could be broadly termed philosophy and theology. The most important of these include: Szkice etyczne (1953), Formale Logik (1956), A history of formal logic (1961), The logic of religion (1965), Sto zabobonów. Krótki filozoficzny słownik zabobonów (1987), Marksizm – leninizm. Nauka czy wiara? (1988),Współczesne metody myślenia (1992), Zarys historii filozofii (1993) and Lewicę, religię, sowietologię (1996).

Bocheński had his own reflections and theories regarding the nation, based on the concepts of Fr Woroniecki, and not limited to only the issues of language, culture or ideology, but also to the whole sphere of emotions and axiology. His views in these matters corresponded with the traditions of Polish national thought, which placed emphasis on biological, economic and cultural development as a prerequisite in the struggle for independence, which only then could be followed by the building of the actual state. Patriotism, in his opinion, should not be withdrawn, but offensive in so far as the nation's potential permitted. In this respect, he was both a militarist and a positivist, convinced, similarly to his brother Alexander, that the Poles had to face a long and arduous education in overcoming their much accumulated shortcomings.

Bocheński criticised Marxism from the philosophical point of view as a closed system of thought, misinterpreting interpersonal relations through a false belief in the existence of a ‘scientific worldview’, which was by definition anti-Christian and especially dangerous as an instrument of Soviet imperial politics and propaganda. Hence, he fought Marxism by all possible means, for instance, by taking part in the 1950s trial of the German Communist Party by the Federal Constitutional Court in Karlsruhe, which led to its banning. He also criticised Marxism from an economic standpoint by creating his own philosophy of entrepreneurship as a phenomenon conditioned by various human factors, which could not be explained by a closed theory.

The Dominican was not only an outstanding scholar of Thomism, but also its ardent supporter, being particularly attached to Thomistic concepts of pluralism and its consequent concepts of personalism, especially in the interpretation of Jacques Maritain, as expressed in his text published in Znak, Polish People's Republic [sic] (I. Bocheński, ‘ABC tomizmu’, Znak, 1950, No. 2, pp. 89–126). Bocheński's personalism did not, however, mean the absolutization of the idea of being able to implement Christianity in every political system, or that every political system was compatible with Christianity. Therefore, he did not agree with the Poles who in the 1940s and 50s supported Emmanuel Mounier's view that personalism could deepen socialism and vulgarised it to the level of leftist integrationism, stating as, for instance, Konstanty Łubieński, that a Catholic not only can, but even ought to be socialist (K. Łubieński, ‘Open letter to Mr Juliusz Lada. (On the margin of the note in The Tablet)’, Dziś i Jutro, 1948, No. 49, pp. 1–2). The PAX Association ideology derived from this theses, because this is what we are talking about here, assumed that despite different worldview inspirations, Marxism and Catholicism shared the same social and economic goals. Of course, this issue could not be viewed in a strictly theological context. As a staunch anti-communist, Bocheński was particularly opposed to any efforts of combining Catholicism with communism, and that was exactly what the PAX Association was implying.

The philosopher was personally involved in putting on the index of the Congregation of the Holy Office Bolesław Piasecki's Zagadnienia istotne (Real Issues) as well as PAX's biweekly Dziś i Jutro (Today and Tomorrow) – where incidentally his brother occasionally published texts. The official reason for this was that Piasecki placed the Act of Creation above the Act of Salvation, which would allow Catholics to engage in any political system that in his subjective appraisal would lead to positive changes in the world. Bocheński received the text of the book from Janina Kolendo with Piasecki's approval because he hoped Alexander's older brother would understand the thesis and even persuade the Vatican to look also favourably on it. Józef Bocheński, was outraged and wrote a critical memorandum to Bishop Józef Gawlina, who then passed it on to the Holy Office. Bocheński, speaking on Polish Radio Free Europe, also engaged in that station's campaign against Piasecki's activities.

Józef's stance against PAX also made him critical of the path selected by Alexander. Admittedly, the two brothers had a good relationship and corresponded with each other whenever it was possible. Aleksander would visit Józef in France or Switzerland, where, as the former half-jokingly recalled, he would and vainly try to persuade Jozef to divide competencies in the family, leaving the Dominican the theological issues and all the political issues to himself. Jozef, however, had no illusions that his younger brother had taken a path that was wrong and damaging to the Church. Already in the interwar period, Józef described Aleksander's style of reasoning as foggy, in contrast to the brilliant analyses of his youngest brother Adolf. In the post-war period, Jozef primarily disapproved of Aleksander's support of Piasecki's campaign against Primate Wyszyński, which included PAX accusing the cardinal of disruptive activities. Aleksander not only approved of the open letter of the PAX Association in this matter, but even tried to persuade bishops Bohdan Brejza and Henryk Grzondziel to support it. Józef did not hide his indignation in a letter to his brother, in which he condemned Aleksander's actions as contrary to ‘binding’ principles, and stated that he had abstained from public criticism not because of family considerations but because of the apolitical stance he had to maintain as a scholar and university rector.

During one of their meetings, in 1961, Aleksander and Józef served as intermediaries between Piasecki and the Vatican. This was a classified, informal meeting in which the Holy See tried to improve relations between PAX and Primate Wyszyński in return for information Piasecki could provide about the Church in the East. The whole matter never went beyond the sphere of speculation, but it showed that for the sake of the Church, Józef Bocheński was willing to put all personal and political animosities to one side.

In September 1982, he took part in negotiations to release hostages held at the Polish Embassy in Bern. In 1987, he visited Poland for the first time after almost 50 years.

Bocheński, a fan of fast cars and aviation (obtaining a pilot's licence at the age of 68 in 1970, and achieving a total flight experience of 765 hours and 40 minutes), was famous for his original views and unconventional manner. In his will, he dedicated his body to science. Józef Maria Bocheński died in Fribourg on 2 February 1995.

His distinctions and awards included the Monte Cassino Commemorative Cross and the Gold Cross of the Polish Army Field Bishop in 1945, the Order of Italy and the Copernicus Silver Medal in 1973, the Alfred Jurzykowski Prize in 1974 and the Polonia Restituta Commander's Cross (awarded Polish President Kazimierz Sabbat) in 1987. By a resolution of the Senate of the Republic of Poland, 2020 was proclaimed the year of Fr Józef Bocheński.

== Cracow Circle ==
Bocheński is perhaps the most famous exponent of the Cracow Circle Thomism, which has been called "the most significant expression of Catholic thought between the two World Wars." The Circle was founded by a group of philosophers and theologians that, in distinction from traditional neo-Thomism, embraced modern formal logic and applied it to traditional Thomist philosophy and theology. Inspired by the logical clarity of Aquinas, members of the Circle held both philosophy and theology to contain "propositions with truth-values…a structured body of propositions connected in meaning and subject matter, and linked by logical relations of compatibility and incompatibility, entailment etc." "The Cracow Circle set about investigating and where possible improving this logical structure with the most advanced logical tools available at the time, namely those of modern mathematical logic, then called ‘logistic’." Other members of the Circle included Jan Salamucha and Jan F. Drewnowski.

== Précis de logique mathématique ==
Bochenski said "that once when he went to visit Lukasiewicz before the war [World War II], Lukasiewicz conveyed him inside excitedly, indicated a complex formula, beginning something like 'CCC...', and said, 'Look at this beautiful and self-evidently true formula.' Clearly the formula's truth was not immediately evident to the bemused Bochenski."

In Bocheński's Précis de logique mathématique, he uses this notation, in the style of Łukasiewicz:

	(F,F)(F,T)(T,F)(T,T)			(F,F)(F,T)(T,F)(T,T)	
Tautology (truth)	(T T T T)(p,q)	Vpq	Opq	(F F F F)(p,q)	Contradiction (falsity)
Logical disjunction (Disjunction)	(F T T T)(p,q)	Apq	Xpq	(T F F F)(p,q)	Logical NOR (joint denial)
Converse conditional (Converse implication)	(T F T T)(p,q)	Bpq	Mpq	(F T F F)(p,q)	Converse nonimplication
Material conditional (Material implication)	(T T F T)(p,q)	Cpq	Lpq	(F F T F)(p,q)	Material nonimplication
Logical NAND (Alternative denial)	(T T T F)(p,q)	Dpq	Kpq	(F F F T)(p,q)	Conjunction
Logical biconditional (Equivalence)	(T F F T)(p,q)	Epq	Jpq	(F T T F)(p,q)	Exclusive disjunction (nonequivalence)
Negation (of first argument)	(T T F F)(p,q)	Np; Fpq	p; Ipq	(F F T T)(p,q)	Projection function to first argument
Negation (of second argument)	(T F T F)(p,q)	Nq; Gpq	q; Hpq	(F T F T)(p,q)	Projection function to second argument

== The logical hexagon for the square of opposition ==
Robert Blanché quoted a passage of Bochenski's Formale Logik in Structures intellectuelles (1966, 39): "Hindu logic knows of three logical propositions and not the four of western logic. For it Some S are P does not signify Some S at least are P but Some S are P but not all." This passage shows that Indian tradition explicitly speaks of the existence of partial quantity, the third quantity to be considered along with totality apprehended by A the universal affirmative of the square, and zero quantity apprehended by E the universal negative of the square. To the two universals A and E entertaining a relationship of contrariety, one should add the third contrary constituted by the double negation of the first two. As the subcontrary I contradicts E and the subcontrary O contradicts A, the logical proposition apprehending partial quantity can be represented by the conjunction of I and O : I & O. In Blanché’s logical hexagon this conjunction is symbolized by the letter Y. Many scholars think that the logical square of opposition, representing four values, should be replaced by the logical hexagon, which has the power to express more relations of opposition.

== Works ==
- Elementa logicae graecae (1937), Rome: Anonima Libraria Catolica Italiana.
- Manuale di filosofia bolscevica (1946)
- La logique de Théophraste (1947), 1987 reprint, New York, Garland Publishing.
- Europäische Philosophie der Gegenwart (1947), Bern: A. Francke.
- Précis de logique mathématique (1949), Bussum, North Holland: F. G. Kroonder.
- ABC tomizmu (1950), London: Veritas.
- Der sowjetrussische Dialektische Materialismus (1950)
- Ancient formal logic (1951)
- Szkice etyczne: Zebrał i ułożył Adam Bocheński (1953), London: Veritas.
- Die zeitgenössischen Denkmethoden (1954)
- Die kommunistische Ideologie und die Würde, Freiheit und Gleichheit der Menschen im Sinne des Grundgesetzes für die Bundesrepublik Deutschland vom 23.5.1949 (1956), [Bonn]: Bundeszentrale für Heimatdienst.
- Bibliographie der Sowietischen Philosophie (1959), Fribourg: Ost-Europa Institut.
- Formale Logik (1956) translated into English as A history of formal logic (1961)
- Der sowjetrussische dialektische Materialismus (Diamat) (1962)
- (co-edited with Gerhart Niemayer) Handbook on Communism(1962), New York: Praeger.
- The Logic of Religion (1965)
- Wege zum philosophischen Denken (1967)
- Guide to Marxist philosophy: an introductory bibliography (1972), Chicago: Swallow Press.
- Philosophy, an introduction (1972), New York: Harper & Row.
- Marxismus-Leninismus. Wissenschaft oder Glaube? (1973), München: Olzog.
- Was ist Autorität?: Einf. in d. Logik d. Autorität (1974), Fribourg: Herder.
- Logic and Ontology (1974)
- Sto zabobonów. Krótki filozoficzny słownik zabobonów ("One Hundred Superstitions. A Short Philosophical Dictionary of Superstitions", 1987).
- Logika i filozofia (1993)
- Miedzy logika a wiara (1994)
- Szkice o nacjonalizmie i katolicyzmie polskim (1994), Komorów: Wydawn. Antyk, Marcin Dybowski.
- Wspomnienia (1994), Kraków: Philed.
- Lewica, religia, sowietologia (1996), Warsaw: Zakon Ojców Dominikanów.
- The Road to Understanding. More than Dreamt of in Your Philosophy (1996), ISBN 1-886670-06-4

== See also ==
- Analytical Thomism
- Commutative property
- History of philosophy in Poland
- List of Poles
- Howison Lectures in Philosophy
