= Valuation (logic) =

In logic and model theory, a valuation can be:

- In propositional logic, an assignment of truth values to propositional variables, with a corresponding assignment of truth values to all propositional formulas with those variables.
- In first-order logic and higher-order logics, a structure, (the interpretation) and the corresponding assignment of a truth value to each sentence in the language for that structure (the valuation proper). The interpretation must be a homomorphism, while valuation is simply a function.

== Mathematical logic ==
In mathematical logic (especially model theory), a valuation is an assignment of truth values to formal sentences that follows a truth schema. Valuations are also called truth assignments.

In propositional logic, there are no quantifiers, and formulas are built from propositional variables using logical connectives. In this context, a valuation begins with an assignment of a truth value to each propositional variable. This assignment can be uniquely extended to an assignment of truth values to all propositional formulas.

In first-order logic, a language consists of a collection of constant symbols, a collection of function symbols, and a collection of relation symbols. Formulas are built out of atomic formulas using logical connectives and quantifiers. A structure consists of a set (domain of discourse) that determines the range of the quantifiers, along with interpretations of the constant, function, and relation symbols in the language. Corresponding to each structure is a unique truth assignment for all sentences (formulas with no free variables) in the language.

== Notation ==
If $v$ is a valuation, that is, a mapping from the atoms to the set $\{ t, f \}$, then the double-bracket notation is commonly used to denote a valuation; that is, $[\![\phi]\!]_v = v(\phi)$ for a propositional formula $\phi$.

== See also ==
- Algebraic semantics
