= Material nonimplication =

Logical connective

NIMPLY
- Definition: $x\overline{y}$
- Truth table: $(0100)$
- Logic gate

Normal forms
- Disjunctive: $x\overline{y}$
- Conjunctive: $x + \overline{y}$
- Zhegalkin polynomial: $x \oplus xy$

Post's lattices
- 0-preserving: yes
- 1-preserving: no
- Monotone: no
- Affine: no
- Self-dual: no

Material nonimplication or abjunction (from Latin ab 'away' and junctio 'to join') is a term referring to a logic operation used in generic circuits and Boolean algebra. It is the negation of material implication. That is to say that for any two propositions $P$ and $Q$, the material nonimplication from $P$ to $Q$ is true if and only if the negation of the material implication from $P$ to $Q$ is true. This is more naturally stated as that the material nonimplication from $P$ to $Q$ is true only if $P$ is true and $Q$ is false.

It may be written using logical notation as $P \nrightarrow Q$, $P \not \supset Q$, or "Lpq" (in Bocheński notation), and is logically equivalent to $\neg (P \rightarrow Q)$, and $P \land \neg Q$.

== Definition ==
=== Truth table ===
$P$	$Q$	$P \nrightarrow Q$
F	F	F
F	T	F
T	F	T
T	T	F

=== Logical equivalences ===
Material nonimplication may be defined as the negation of material implication.

$P \nrightarrow Q$	$\Leftrightarrow$	$\neg (P \rightarrow Q)$
	$\Leftrightarrow$	$\neg$

In classical logic, it is also equivalent to the negation of the disjunction of $\neg P$ and $Q$, and also the conjunction of $P$ and $\neg Q$

$P \nrightarrow Q$	$\Leftrightarrow$	$\neg($	$\neg P$	$\lor$	$Q)$	$\Leftrightarrow$	$P$	$\land$	$\neg Q$
	$\Leftrightarrow$	$\neg($		$\lor$	$)$	$\Leftrightarrow$		$\land$

== Properties ==
falsehood-preserving: The interpretation under which all variables are assigned a truth value of "false" produces a truth value of "false" as a result of material nonimplication.

== Symbol ==
The symbol for material nonimplication is simply a crossed-out material implication symbol. Its Unicode symbol is 219B_{16} (8603 decimal): ↛.

== Natural language ==
=== Grammatical ===
"p minus q."

"p without q."

=== Rhetorical ===
"p but not q."

"q is false, in spite of p."

== Computer science ==
Bitwise operation: P & ~Q. This is usually called "bit clear" (BIC) or "and not" (ANDN).

Logical operation: P && !Q.

== See also ==
- Implication
- Set difference
