= Sheffer stroke =

Logical operation

NAND
- Definition: $\overline{x \cdot y}$
- Truth table: $(0111)$
- Logic gate

Normal forms
- Disjunctive: $\overline{x} + \overline{y}$
- Conjunctive: $\overline{x} + \overline{y}$
- Zhegalkin polynomial: $1 \oplus xy$

Post's lattices
- 0-preserving: no
- 1-preserving: no
- Monotone: no
- Affine: no
- Self-dual: no

In Boolean functions and propositional calculus, the Sheffer stroke denotes a logical operation that is equivalent to the negation of the conjunction operation, expressed in ordinary language as "not both". It is also called non-conjunction, alternative denial (since it says in effect that at least one of its operands is false), or NAND ("not and"). In digital electronics, it corresponds to the NAND gate. It is named after Henry Maurice Sheffer and written as $\mid$ or as $\uparrow$ or as $\overline{\wedge}$ or as $Dpq$ in Polish notation by Łukasiewicz (but not as ||, often used to represent disjunction).

Its dual is the NOR operator (also known as the Peirce arrow, Quine dagger or Webb operator). Like its dual, NAND can be used by itself, without any other logical operator, to constitute a logical formal system (making NAND functionally complete). This property makes the NAND gate crucial to modern digital electronics, including its use in computer processor design.

== Definition ==
The non-conjunction is a logical operation on two logical values. It produces a value of true, if — and only if — at least one of the propositions is false.

=== Truth table ===
The truth table of $A \uparrow B$ is as follows.

$A$	$B$	$A \uparrow B$
F	F	T
F	T	T
T	F	T
T	T	F

=== Logical equivalences ===
The Sheffer stroke of $P$ and $Q$ is the negation of their conjunction

$P \uparrow Q$	$\Leftrightarrow$	$\neg (P \land Q)$
	$\Leftrightarrow$	$\neg$

By De Morgan's laws, this is also equivalent to the disjunction of the negations of $P$ and $Q$

$P \uparrow Q$	$\Leftrightarrow$	$\neg P$	$\lor$	$\neg Q$
	$\Leftrightarrow$		$\lor$

== Alternative notations and names ==
Peirce was the first to show the functional completeness of non-conjunction (representing this as $\overline{\curlywedge}$) but did not publish his result. Peirce's editor added $\overline{\curlywedge}$) for non-disjunction.

In 1911, Stamm was the first to publish a proof of the completeness of non-conjunction, representing this with $\sim$ (the Stamm hook) and non-disjunction in print at the first time and showed their functional completeness.

In 1913, Sheffer described non-disjunction using $\mid$ and showed its functional completeness. Sheffer also used $\wedge$ for non-disjunction. Many people, beginning with Nicod in 1917, and followed by Whitehead and Russell, mistakenly thought Sheffer had described non-conjunction using $\mid$, naming this symbol the Sheffer stroke.

In 1928, Hilbert and Ackermann described non-conjunction with the operator $/$.

In 1929, Łukasiewicz used $D$ in $Dpq$ for non-conjunction in his Polish notation.

An alternative notation for non-conjunction is $\uparrow$. It is not clear who first introduced this notation, although the corresponding $\downarrow$ for non-disjunction was used by Quine in 1940.

== History ==
The stroke is named after Henry Maurice Sheffer, who in 1913 published a paper in the Transactions of the American Mathematical Society providing an axiomatization of Boolean algebras using the stroke, and proved its equivalence to a standard formulation thereof by Huntington employing the familiar operators of propositional logic (AND, OR, NOT). Because of self-duality of Boolean algebras, Sheffer's axioms are equally valid for either of the NAND or NOR operations in place of the stroke. Sheffer interpreted the stroke as a sign for nondisjunction (NOR) in his paper, mentioning non-conjunction only in a footnote and without a special sign for it. It was Jean Nicod who first used the stroke as a sign for non-conjunction (NAND) in a paper of 1917 and which has since become current practice. Russell and Whitehead used the Sheffer stroke in the 1927 second edition of Principia Mathematica and suggested it as a replacement for the "OR" and "NOT" operations of the first edition.

Charles Sanders Peirce (1880) had discovered the functional completeness of NAND or NOR more than 30 years earlier, using the term ampheck (for 'cutting both ways'), but he never published his finding. Two years before Sheffer, Edward Stamm also described the NAND and NOR operators and showed that the other Boolean operations could be expressed by it.

== Properties ==
NAND is commutative but not associative, which means that $P \uparrow Q \leftrightarrow Q \uparrow P$ but $(P \uparrow Q) \uparrow R \not\leftrightarrow P \uparrow (Q \uparrow R)$.

=== Functional completeness ===
The Sheffer stroke, taken by itself, is a functionally complete set of connectives. This can be seen from the fact that NAND does not possess any of the following five properties, each of which is required to be absent from, and the absence of all of which is sufficient for, at least one member of a set of functionally complete operators: truth-preservation, falsity-preservation, linearity, monotonicity, self-duality. (An operator is truth-preserving if its value is truth whenever all of its arguments are truth, or falsity-preserving if its value is falsity whenever all of its arguments are falsity.)

It can also be proved by first showing, with a truth table, that $\neg A$ is truth-functionally equivalent to $A \uparrow A$. Then, since $A \uparrow B$ is truth-functionally equivalent to $\neg (A \land B)$, and $A \lor B$ is equivalent to $\neg(\neg A \land \neg B)$, the Sheffer stroke suffices to define the set of connectives $\{\land, \lor, \neg\}$, which is shown to be truth-functionally complete by the Disjunctive Normal Form Theorem.

== Other Boolean operations in terms of the Sheffer stroke ==
Expressed in terms of NAND $\uparrow$, the usual operators of propositional logic are:

$\neg P$ / $\Leftrightarrow$ / $P$ / $\uparrow$ / $P$; / $\Leftrightarrow$ / / $\uparrow$	$P \rightarrow Q$ / $\Leftrightarrow$ / $~P$ / $\uparrow$ / $(Q \uparrow Q)$ / $\Leftrightarrow$ / $~P$ / $\uparrow$ / $(P \uparrow Q)$; / $\Leftrightarrow$ / / $\uparrow$ / / $\Leftrightarrow$ / / $\uparrow$	$P \leftrightarrow Q$ / $\Leftrightarrow$ / $(P \uparrow Q)$ / $\uparrow$ / $((P \uparrow P) \uparrow (Q \uparrow Q))$; / $\Leftrightarrow$ / / $\uparrow$
$P \land Q$ / $\Leftrightarrow$ / $(P \uparrow Q)$ / $\uparrow$ / $(P \uparrow Q)$; / $\Leftrightarrow$ / / $\uparrow$	$P \lor Q$ / $\Leftrightarrow$ / $(P \uparrow P)$ / $\uparrow$ / $(Q \uparrow Q)$; / $\Leftrightarrow$ / / $\uparrow$

== See also ==
- Boolean domain
- CMOS
- Gate equivalent (GE)
- Logical graph
- Minimal axioms for Boolean algebra
- NAND flash memory
- NAND logic
- Peirce's law
- Peirce arrow = NOR
- Sole sufficient operator
