= Boolean-valued function =

Function that outputs either true or false

A Boolean-valued function (sometimes called a predicate or a proposition) is a function of the type f : X → B, where X is an arbitrary set and where B is a Boolean domain, i.e. a generic two-element set, (for example B = {0, 1}), whose elements are interpreted as logical values, for example, 0 = false and 1 = true, i.e., a single bit of information.

In the formal sciences, mathematics, mathematical logic, statistics, and their applied disciplines, a Boolean-valued function may also be referred to as a characteristic function, indicator function, predicate, or proposition. In all of these uses, it is understood that the various terms refer to a mathematical object and not the corresponding semiotic sign or syntactic expression.

In formal semantic theories of truth, a truth predicate is a predicate on the sentences of a formal language, interpreted for logic, that formalizes the intuitive concept that is normally expressed by saying that a sentence is true. A truth predicate may have additional domains beyond the formal language domain, if that is what is required to determine a final truth value.

== See also ==
- Bit
- Boolean data type
- Boolean algebra (logic)
- Boolean domain
- Boolean logic
- Propositional calculus
- Truth table
- Logic minimization
- Indicator function
- Predicate
- Proposition
- Boolean function
