= Outline of logic =

Overview of and topical guide to logic

Logic is the formal science of using reason and is considered a branch of both philosophy and mathematics and to a lesser extent computer science. Logic investigates and classifies the structure of statements and arguments, both through the study of formal systems of inference and the study of arguments in natural language. The scope of logic can therefore be very large, ranging from core topics such as the study of fallacies and paradoxes, to specialized analyses of reasoning such as probability, correct reasoning, and arguments involving causality. One of the aims of logic is to identify the correct (or valid) and incorrect (or fallacious) inferences. Logicians study the criteria for the evaluation of arguments.

== Foundations of logic ==
Philosophy of logic

- Analytic-synthetic distinction
- Antinomy
- A priori and a posteriori
- Definition
- Description
- Entailment
- Identity (philosophy)
- Inference
- Logical form
- Logical implication
- Logical truth
- Logical consequence
- Name
- Necessity
- Material conditional
- Meaning (linguistic)
- Meaning (non-linguistic)
- Paradox (list)
- Possible world
- Presupposition
- Probability
- Quantification
- Reason
- Reasoning
- Reference
- Semantics
- Strict conditional
- Syntax (logic)
- Truth
- Truth value
- Validity

== Branches of logic ==
- Affine logic
- Alethic logic
- Aristotelian logic
- Boolean logic
- Buddhist logic
- Bunched logic
- Categorical logic
- Classical logic
- Computability logic
- Deontic logic
- Dependence logic
- Description logic
- Deviant logic
- Doxastic logic
- Epistemic logic
- First-order logic
- Formal logic
- Free logic
- Fuzzy logic
- Higher-order logic
- Infinitary logic
- Informal logic
- Intensional logic
- Intermediate logic
- Interpretability logic
- Intuitionistic logic
- Linear logic
- Many-valued logic
- Mathematical logic
- Metalogic
- Minimal logic
- Modal logic
- Non-Aristotelian logic
- Non-classical logic
- Noncommutative logic
- Non-monotonic logic
- Ordered logic
- Paraconsistent logic
- Philosophical logic
- Predicate logic
- Propositional logic
- Provability logic
- Quantum logic
- Relevance logic
- Sequential logic
- Spatial logic
- Strict logic
- Substructural logic
- Syllogistic logic
- Symbolic logic
- Temporal logic
- Term logic
- Topical logic
- Traditional logic
- Zeroth-order logic

== Philosophical logic ==
=== Informal logic and critical thinking ===
Informal logic Critical thinking Argumentation theory

- Argument
- Argument map
- Accuracy and precision
- Ad hoc hypothesis
- Ambiguity
- Analysis
- Attacking Faulty Reasoning
- Belief
- Belief bias
- Bias
- Cognitive bias
- Confirmation bias
- Credibility
- Critical reading
- Critical thinking
- Decidophobia
- Decision making
- Dispositional and occurrent belief
- Emotional reasoning
- Evidence
- Expert
- Explanation
- Explanatory power
- Fact
- Fallacy
- Higher-order thinking
- Inquiry
- Interpretive discussion
- Occam's razor
- Opinion
- Practical syllogism
- Precision questioning
- Propaganda
- Propaganda techniques
- Problem Solving
- Prudence
- Pseudophilosophy
- Reasoning
- Relevance
- Rhetoric
- Rigour
- Socratic questioning
- Source credibility
- Source criticism
- Theory of justification
- Topical logic
- Vagueness

=== Deductive reasoning ===
==== Theories of deduction ====
- Anti-psychologism
- Conceptualism
- Constructivism
- Conventionalism
- Counterpart theory
- Deflationary theory of truth
- Dialetheism
- Fictionalism
- Formalism (philosophy)
- Game theory
- Illuminationist philosophy
- Logical atomism
- Logical holism
- Logicism
- Modal fictionalism
- Nominalism
- Polylogism
- Pragmatism
- Preintuitionism
- Proof theory
- Psychologism
- Ramism
- Semantic theory of truth
- Sophism
- Trivialism
- Ultrafinitism

=== Fallacies ===
- Fallacy (list) – incorrect argumentation in reasoning resulting in a misconception or presumption. By accident or design, fallacies may exploit emotional triggers in the listener or interlocutor (appeal to emotion), or take advantage of social relationships between people (e.g. argument from authority). Fallacious arguments are often structured using rhetorical patterns that obscure any logical argument. Fallacies can be used to win arguments regardless of the merits. There are dozens of types of fallacies.

== Formal logic ==
- Formal logic – Mathematical logic, symbolic logic and formal logic are largely, if not completely synonymous. The essential feature of this field is the use of formal languages to express the ideas whose logical validity is being studied.
  - List of mathematical logic topics

=== Symbols and strings of symbols ===
==== Logical symbols ====
- Logical variables
  - Propositional variable
  - Predicate variable
  - Literal
  - Metavariable
- Logical constants
  - Logical connective
  - Quantifier
  - Identity
  - Brackets

===== Logical connectives =====
Logical connective

- Converse implication
- Converse nonimplication
- Exclusive or
- Logical NOR
- Logical biconditional
- Logical conjunction
- Logical disjunction
- Material implication
- Material nonimplication
- Negation
- Sheffer stroke

==== Strings of symbols ====
- Atomic formula
- Open sentence

==== Types of propositions ====
Proposition

- Analytic proposition
- Axiom
- Atomic sentence
- Clause (logic)
- Contingent proposition
- Contradiction
- Logical truth
- Propositional formula
- Rule of inference
- Sentence (mathematical logic)
- Sequent
- Statement (logic)
- Subalternation
- Tautology
- Theorem

===== Rules of inference =====
Rule of inference (list)

- Biconditional elimination
- Biconditional introduction
- Case analysis
- Commutativity of conjunction
- Conjunction introduction
- Constructive dilemma
- Contraposition (traditional logic)
- Conversion (logic)
- De Morgan's laws
- Destructive dilemma
- Disjunction elimination
- Disjunction introduction
- Disjunctive syllogism
- Double negation elimination
- Generalization (logic)
- Hypothetical syllogism
- Law of excluded middle
- Law of identity
- Modus ponendo tollens
- Modus ponens
- Modus tollens
- Obversion
- Principle of contradiction
- Resolution (logic)
- Simplification
- Transposition (logic)

==== Formal theories ====
- Formal proof
- List of first-order theories

==== Expressions in a metalanguage ====
Metalanguage

- Metalinguistic variable
- Deductive system
- Metatheorem
- Metatheory
- Interpretation

=== Propositional and Boolean logic ===
==== Propositional logic ====
- Absorption law
- Clause (logic)
- Deductive closure
- Distributive property
- Entailment
- Formation rule
- Functional completeness
- Intermediate logic
- Literal (mathematical logic)
- Logical connective
- Logical consequence
- Negation normal form
- Open sentence
- Propositional calculus
- Propositional formula
- Propositional variable
- Rule of inference
- Strict conditional
- Substitution instance
- Truth table
- Zeroth-order logic

==== Boolean logic ====
- Boolean algebra (list)
- Boolean logic
- Boolean algebra (structure)
- Boolean algebras canonically defined
- Introduction to Boolean algebra
- Complete Boolean algebra
- Free Boolean algebra
- Monadic Boolean algebra
- Residuated Boolean algebra
- Two-element Boolean algebra
- Modal algebra
- Derivative algebra (abstract algebra)
- Relation algebra
- Absorption law
- Laws of Form
- De Morgan's laws
- Algebraic normal form
- Canonical form (Boolean algebra)
- Boolean conjunctive query
- Boolean-valued model
- Boolean domain
- Boolean expression
- Boolean ring
- Boolean function
- Boolean-valued function
- Parity function
- Symmetric Boolean function
- Conditioned disjunction
- Field of sets
- Functional completeness
- Implicant
- Logic alphabet
- Logic redundancy
- Logical connective
- Logical matrix
- Product term
- True quantified Boolean formula
- Truth table

=== Predicate logic and relations ===
==== Predicate logic ====
- Atomic formula
- Atomic sentence
- Domain of discourse
- Empty domain
- Extension (predicate logic)
- First-order logic
- First-order predicate
- Formation rule
- Free variables and bound variables
- Generalization (logic)
- Monadic predicate calculus
- Predicate (mathematical logic)
- Predicate logic
- Predicate variable
- Quantification
- Second-order predicate
- Sentence (mathematical logic)
- Universal instantiation

==== Relations ====
Mathematical relation

- Finitary relation
- Antisymmetric relation
- Asymmetric relation
- Bijection
- Bijection, injection and surjection
- Binary relation
- Composition of relations
- Congruence relation
- Connected relation
- Converse relation
- Coreflexive relation
- Covering relation
- Cyclic order
- Dense relation
- Dependence relation
- Dependency relation
- Directed set
- Equivalence relation
- Euclidean relation
- Homogeneous relation
- Idempotence
- Intransitivity
- Involutive relation
- Partial equivalence relation
- Partial function
- Partially ordered set
- Preorder
- Prewellordering
- Propositional function
- Quasitransitive relation
- Reflexive relation
- Serial relation
- Surjective function
- Symmetric relation
- Ternary relation
- Transitive relation
- Trichotomy (mathematics)
- Well-founded relation

== Mathematical logic ==
Mathematical logic

=== Set theory ===
- Set theory list
- Aleph null
- Bijection, injection and surjection
- Binary set
- Cantor's diagonal argument
- Cantor's first uncountability proof
- Cantor's theorem
- Cardinality of the continuum
- Cardinal number
- Codomain
- Complement (set theory)
- Constructible universe
- Continuum hypothesis
- Countable set
- Decidable set
- Denumerable set
- Disjoint sets
- Disjoint union
- Domain of a function
- Effective enumeration
- Element (mathematics)
- Empty function
- Empty set
- Enumeration
- Extensionality
- Finite set
- Forcing (mathematics)
- Function (set theory)
- Function composition
- Generalized continuum hypothesis
- Index set
- Infinite set
- Intension
- Intersection (set theory)
- Inverse function
- Large cardinal
- Löwenheim–Skolem theorem
- Map (mathematics)
- Multiset
- Morse–Kelley set theory
- Naïve set theory
- One-to-one correspondence
- Ordered pair
- Partition of a set
- Pointed set
- Power set
- Projection (set theory)
- Proper subset
- Proper superset
- Range of a function
- Russell's paradox
- Sequence (mathematics)
- Set (mathematics)
- Set of all sets
- Simple theorems in the algebra of sets
- Singleton (mathematics)
- Skolem paradox
- Subset
- Superset
- Tuple
- Uncountable set
- Union (set theory)
- Von Neumann–Bernays–Gödel set theory
- Zermelo set theory
- Zermelo–Fraenkel set theory

=== Metalogic ===
Metalogic – The study of the metatheory of logic.

- Completeness (logic)
- Syntax (logic)
- Consistency
- Decidability (logic)
- Deductive system
- Interpretation (logic)
- Cantor's theorem
- Church's theorem
- Church's thesis
- Effective method
- Formal system
- Gödel's completeness theorem
- Gödel's first incompleteness theorem
- Gödel's second incompleteness theorem
- Independence (mathematical logic)
- Logical consequence
- Löwenheim–Skolem theorem
- Metalanguage
- Metasyntactic variable
- Metatheorem
- Object language – see metalanguage
- Symbol (formal)
- Type–token distinction
- Use–mention distinction
- Well-formed formula

==== Proof theory ====
Proof theory – The study of deductive systems.

- Axiom
- Deductive system
- Formal proof
- Formal system
- Formal theorem
- Syntactic consequence
- Syntax (logic)
- Transformation rules

==== Model theory ====
Model theory – The study of interpretation of formal systems.

- Interpretation (logic)
- Logical validity
- Non-standard model
- Normal model
- Model
- Semantic consequence
- Truth value

=== Computability theory ===
Computability theory – branch of mathematical logic that originated in the 1930s with the study of computable functions and Turing degrees. The field has grown to include the study of generalized computability and definability. The basic questions addressed by recursion theory are "What does it mean for a function from the natural numbers to themselves to be computable?" and "How can noncomputable functions be classified into a hierarchy based on their level of noncomputability?". The answers to these questions have led to a rich theory that is still being actively researched.

- Alpha recursion theory
- Arithmetical set
- Church–Turing thesis
- Computability logic
- Computable function
- Computation
- Decision problem
- Effective method
- Entscheidungsproblem
- Enumeration
- Forcing (computability)
- Halting problem
- History of the Church–Turing thesis
- Lambda calculus
- List of undecidable problems
- Post correspondence problem
- Post's theorem
- Primitive recursive function
- Recursion (computer science)
- Recursive language
- Recursive set
- Recursively enumerable language
- Recursively enumerable set
- Reduction (recursion theory)
- Turing machine

== Semantics of natural language ==
Formal semantics (natural language)

- Formal systems
  - Alternative semantics
  - Categorial grammar
  - Combinatory categorial grammar
  - Discourse representation theory
  - Dynamic semantics
  - Inquisitive semantics
  - Montague grammar
  - Situation semantics
- Concepts
  - Compositionality
  - Counterfactuals
  - Generalized quantifier
  - Logic translation
  - Mereology
  - Modality (natural language)
  - Opaque context
  - Presupposition
  - Propositional attitudes
  - Scope (formal semantics)
  - Type shifter
  - Vagueness

== Classical logic ==
Classical logic

- Properties of classical logics:
  - Law of the excluded middle
  - Double negation elimination
  - Law of noncontradiction
  - Principle of explosion
  - Monotonicity of entailment
  - Idempotency of entailment
  - Commutativity of conjunction
  - De Morgan duality – every logical operator is dual to another
- Term logic
- Outline of logic
  - Baralipton
  - Baroco
  - Bivalence
  - Boolean logic
  - Boolean-valued function
  - Categorical proposition
  - Distribution of terms
  - End term
  - Enthymeme
  - Immediate inference
  - Law of contraries
  - Logical connective
  - Logical cube
  - Logical hexagon
  - Major term
  - Middle term
  - Minor term
  - Octagon of Prophecies
  - Organon
  - Polysyllogism
  - Port-Royal Logic
  - Premise
  - Prior Analytics
  - Absolute and relative terms
  - Sorites paradox
  - Square of opposition
  - Triangle of opposition
  - Sum of Logic
  - Syllogism
  - Tetralemma
  - Truth function

=== Modal logic ===
Modal logic

- Alethic logic
- Deontic logic
- Doxastic logic
- Epistemic logic
- Temporal logic

== Non-classical logic ==
Non-classical logic

- Affine logic
- Bunched logic
- Computability logic
- Decision theory
- Description logic
- Deviant logic
- Free logic
- Fuzzy logic
- Game theory
- Intensional logic
- Intuitionistic logic
- Linear logic
- Many-valued logic
- Minimal logic
- Non-monotonic logic
- Noncommutative logic
- Paraconsistent logic
- Probability theory
- Quantum logic
- Relevance logic
- Strict conditional
- Substructural logic

== Concepts of logic ==
- Deductive reasoning
- Inductive reasoning
- Abductive reasoning

Mathematical logic

- Proof theory
- Set theory
- Formal system
  - Predicate logic
    - Predicate
    - Higher-order logic
  - Propositional calculus
    - Proposition
- Boolean algebra
  - Boolean logic
  - Truth value
  - Venn diagram
  - Peirce's law
- Aristotelian logic
- Non-Aristotelian logic
- Informal logic
- Fuzzy logic
- Infinitary logic
  - Infinity
- Categorical logic
- Linear logic
- Metalogic
- Order
- Ordered logic
- Temporal logic
  - Linear temporal logic
    - Linear temporal logic to Büchi automaton
- Sequential logic
- Provability logic
  - Interpretability logic
    - Interpretability
- Quantum logic
- Relevant logic
- Consequent
- Affirming the consequent
- Antecedent
- Denying the antecedent
- Theorem
- Axiom
- Axiomatic system
- Axiomatization
- Conditional proof
- Invalid proof
- Degree of truth
- Truth
- Truth condition
- Truth function
- Double negation
  - Double negation elimination
- Fallacy
  - Existential fallacy
  - Logical fallacy
  - Syllogistic fallacy
- Type theory
- Game theory
- Game semantics
- Rule of inference
- Inference procedure
- Inference rule
- Introduction rule
- Law of excluded middle
- Law of non-contradiction
- Logical constant
  - Logical connective
  - Quantifier
- Logic gate
  - Boolean Function
  - Quantum logic gate
- Tautology
- Logical assertion
- Logical conditional
- Logical biconditional
- Logical equivalence
- Logical AND
- Negation
- Logical OR
- Logical NAND
- Logical NOR
- Contradiction
- Subalternation
- Logicism
- Polysyllogism
- Syllogism
- Hypothetical syllogism
- Major premise
- Minor premise
- Term
- Singular term
- Major term
- Middle term
- Quantification
- Plural quantification
- Logical argument
  - Validity
  - Soundness
- Inverse (logic)
- Non sequitur
- Tolerance
- Satisfiability
- Logical language
- Paradox
- Polish notation
- Principia Mathematica
- Quod erat demonstrandum
- Reductio ad absurdum
- Rhetoric
- Self-reference
- Necessary and sufficient
- Sufficient condition
- Nonfirstorderizability
- Occam's Razor
- Socratic dialogue
- Socratic method
- Argument form
- Logic programming
- Unification

== History of logic ==
History of logic

== Literature about logic ==
=== Journals ===
- Journal of Logic, Language and Information
- Journal of Philosophical Logic
- Linguistics and Philosophy

=== Books ===
- A System of Logic
- Attacking Faulty Reasoning
- Begriffsschrift
- Categories (Aristotle)
- Charles Sanders Peirce bibliography
- De Interpretatione
- Gödel, Escher, Bach
- Introduction to Mathematical Philosophy
- Language, Truth, and Logic
- Laws of Form
- Novum Organum
- On Formally Undecidable Propositions of Principia Mathematica and Related Systems
- Organon
- Philosophy of Arithmetic
- Polish Logic
- Port-Royal Logic
- Posterior Analytics
- Principia Mathematica
- Principles of Mathematical Logic
- Prior Analytics
- Rhetoric (Aristotle)
- Sophistical Refutations
- Sum of Logic
- The Art of Being Right
- The Foundations of Arithmetic
- Topics (Aristotle)
- Tractatus Logico-Philosophicus

== Logic organizations ==
- Association for Symbolic Logic

== Logicians ==
- List of logicians
- List of philosophers of language

== See also ==
- Glossary of logic
- Index of logic articles
- Mathematics
  - List of basic mathematics topics
  - List of mathematics articles
- Philosophy
  - List of basic philosophy topics
  - List of philosophy topics
  - Outline of philosophy
- Outline of discrete mathematics – for introductory set theory and other supporting material
