= Outline of philosophy =

Philosophy is the study of general and fundamental problems concerning matters such as existence, knowledge, values, reason, mind, and language. It is distinguished from other ways of addressing fundamental questions (such as mysticism, myth) by being critical and generally systematic and by its reliance on rational argument. It involves logical analysis of language and clarification of the meaning of words and concepts.

The word "philosophy" comes from the Greek philosophia (φιλοσοφία), which literally means "love of wisdom".

== Branches of philosophy ==
The branches of philosophy and their sub-branches that are used in contemporary philosophy are as follows.

=== Aesthetics ===
Aesthetics is study of the nature of beauty, art, and taste, and the creation of personal kinds of truth.

- Philosophy of art
- Philosophy of color
- Philosophy of design
- Philosophy of film
- Philosophy of literature

=== Epistemology ===
Epistemology is the branch of philosophy that studies the source, nature and validity of knowledge.

- Social epistemology – inquiry into the social aspects of knowledge.
- Formal epistemology – the application of formal models to study knowledge.
- Metaepistemology – studying the foundations of epistemology itself.

=== Ethics ===
Ethics – study of value and morality.

- Applied ethics – philosophical examination, from a moral standpoint, of particular issues in private and public life that are matters of moral judgment. It is thus the attempts to use philosophical methods to identify the morally correct course of action in various fields of human life.
  - Bioethics – analysis of controversial ethical issues emerging from advances in medicine.
  - Environmental ethics – studies ethical issues concerning the non-human world. It exerts influence on a large range of disciplines including environmental law, environmental sociology, ecotheology, ecological economics, ecology and environmental geography.
  - Medical ethics – studies ethical issues concerning medicine and medical research.
  - Professional ethics – ethics to improve professionalism.
- Discourse ethics – discovery of ethical principles through the study of language.
- Normative ethics – study of ethical theories that prescribe how people ought to act.
- Metaethics – branch of ethics that seeks to understand the nature of ethical properties, statements, attitudes, and judgments.

=== Logic ===
Logic – the systematic study of the form of valid inference and reasoning.

Also regarded as the separate formal science.

- Classical logic
  - Propositional logic
  - First-order logic
  - Second-order logic
  - Higher-order logic
- Non-classical logic
  - Description logic
  - Digital logic
  - Fuzzy logic
  - Intuitionistic logic
  - Many-valued logic
  - Modal logic
    - Alethic logic
    - Deontic logic
    - Doxastic logic
    - Epistemic logic
    - Temporal logic
  - Paraconsistent logic
  - Substructural logic
- Metalogic
- Philosophy of logic

=== Metaphysics ===
Metaphysics – concerned with explaining the fundamental nature of being and the world that encompasses it.

- Cosmology – the study of the nature and origins of the universe.
- Ontology – philosophical study of the nature of being, becoming, existence, or reality, as well as the basic categories of being and their relations.
  - Meta-ontology – study of the ontological foundations of ontology itself.
- Philosophy of space and time – branch of philosophy concerned with the issues surrounding the ontology, epistemology, and character of space and time.

=== Other ===
- Transhumanism
- Metaphilosophy
- Phenomenology
- Philosophy of action
- Philosophy of education
- Philosophy of environment
- Philosophy of history
- Philosophy of language
- Philosophy of law
- Philosophy of life
- Philosophy of love
- Philosophy of mathematics
- Philosophy of mind
- Philosophy of religion
- Philosophy of sex
- Philosophy of science
  - Philosophical anthropology
  - Philosophy of archaeology
  - Philosophy of biology
  - Philosophy of chemistry
  - Philosophy of computer science
    - Philosophy of artificial intelligence
  - Philosophy of geography
  - Philosophy of medicine
  - Philosophy of physics
    - Interpretations of quantum mechanics
  - Philosophy of social science
    - Philosophy of economics
    - Philosophy of psychology
- Philosophy of sports
- Philosophy of war
- Political philosophy
- Pragmatism
- Praxeology

== Philosophic traditions by region ==
Regional variations of philosophy.

=== African philosophy ===
- Akan philosophy
- Ethiopian philosophy
- Ubuntu philosophy
- Africana philosophy

=== Eastern philosophy ===
- Chinese philosophy
- Indian philosophy
- Indonesian philosophy
- Japanese philosophy
- Korean philosophy
- Vietnamese philosophy

=== Middle Eastern philosophy ===
- Iranian philosophy
- Pakistani philosophy
- Turkish philosophy

=== Indigenous American philosophy ===
- Aztec philosophy

=== Western philosophy ===
- American philosophy
- Australian philosophy
- British philosophy
- Canadian philosophy
- Czech philosophy
- Danish philosophy
- Dutch philosophy
- French philosophy
- Greek philosophy
- German philosophy
- Italian philosophy
- Maltese philosophy
- Polish philosophy
- Romanian philosophy
- Russian philosophy
- Scottish philosophy
- Slovene philosophy
- Spanish philosophy
- Yugoslav philosophy

== History of philosophy ==
The history of philosophy in specific contexts of time and space.

=== Timeline of philosophy ===
- 11th century in philosophy
- 12th century in philosophy
- 13th century in philosophy
- 14th century in philosophy
- 15th century in philosophy
- 16th century in philosophy
- 17th century in philosophy
- 18th century in philosophy
- 19th-century philosophy
- 20th-century philosophy

=== Ancient and classical philosophy ===
Philosophies during ancient history.

==== Ancient Greek and Roman philosophy ====
- Pre-Socratic philosophy
  - Milesian school - Thales, Anaximander, Anaximenes
  - Xenophanes
  - Pythagoreanism
  - Heraclitus
  - Eleatics - Parmenides, Zeno, and Melissus
  - Pluralists - Empedocles and Anaxagoras
  - Atomists - Leucippus, Democritus
  - Sophists
- Classical Greek philosophy
  - Socratic schools
    - Megarian school
    - Eretrian school
    - Cynicism
    - Cyrenaics
  - Platonism
  - Peripatetic school
- Hellenistic philosophy
  - Academic skepticism
    - Middle Academy
    - New Academy
  - Epicureanism
  - Pyrrhonism
  - Stoicism
- Ancient Roman philosophy
  - Middle Platonism
  - Neopythagoreanism
  - Neoplatonism

==== Classical Chinese philosophy ====
- Hundred Schools of Thought
  - Confucianism
  - Legalism
  - Taoism
  - Mohism
  - School of Naturalists
  - School of Names
  - School of Diplomacy
  - Agriculturalism
  - Syncretism
  - Yangism

==== Classical Indian philosophy ====
- Orthodox schools
  - Samkhya
  - Yoga
  - Nyaya
  - Vaisheshika
  - Mīmāṃsā
  - Vedanta
- Heterodox schools
  - Ajñana
  - Jain philosophy
  - Buddhist philosophy
  - Ājīvika
  - Charvaka

=== Medieval and post-classical philosophy ===
Philosophies during post-classical history.

==== Christian philosophy ====
- Neoplatonism Christian
- Scholasticism
- Thomism

==== Islamic philosophy ====
- Avicennism
- Averroism
- Illuminationism

==== Jewish philosophy ====
- Judeo-Islamic philosophies

==== Post-classical Chinese philosophy ====
- Neo-Confucianism
- Xuanxue
- Zen

=== Modern and contemporary philosophy ===
Philosophies during the modern era.

==== Renaissance philosophy ====
- Renaissance humanism
- Renaissance Jewish philosophy
- Machiavellianism
- Neostoicism
- Ramism
- School of Salamanca

==== Early modern philosophy ====
- Empiricism
- Rationalism
- Idealism

==== Contemporary philosophy ====
- Analytic philosophy
  - Logical positivism
  - Logicism
- Continental philosophy
  - Phenomenology
  - Existentialism
  - Deconstruction
  - Structuralism
- Contemporary Asian philosophy
  - Buddhist modernism
  - New Confucianism
  - Maoism
  - Kyoto School
  - Neo-Vedanta
- Contemporary Islamic philosophy
  - Transcendent theosophy
- Traditionalist School

== Philosophical schools of thought ==
Philosophical schools of thought not tied to particular historic contexts.

=== Aesthetical movements ===
- Symbolism
- Romanticism
- Historicism
- Classicism
- Modernism
- Postmodernism
- Psychoanalytic theory

=== Epistemological stances ===
- Coherentism
- Constructivist epistemology
- Contextualism
- Embodied cognition
- Empiricism
- Fallibilism
- Foundationalism
- Holism
- Infinitism
- Innatism
- Internalism and externalism
- Logical positivism
- Naïve realism
- Naturalized epistemology
- Objectivist epistemology
- Phenomenalism
- Positivism
- Reductionism
- Reformed epistemology
- Reliabilism
- Representative realism
- Rationalism
- Situated cognition
- Skepticism
- Theory of Forms
- Transcendental idealism
- Uniformitarianism

=== Ethical theories ===
- Consequentialism
- Deontology
- Virtue ethics
- Moral realism
- Moral relativism
- Error theory
- Non-cognitivism
- Ethical egoism
- Cultural relativism
- Evolutionary ethics
- Evolution of morality
- Face-to-face

=== Logical systems ===
- Classical logic
- Intermediate logic
- Intuitionistic logic
- Minimal logic
- Relevant logic
- Affine logic
- Linear logic
- Ordered logic
- Dialetheism

=== Metaphysical stances ===
- Absurdism
- Anti-realism
- Cartesian dualism
- Free will
- Materialism
- Meaning of life
- Idealism
- Existentialism
- Essentialism
- Libertarianism
- Determinism
- Compatibilism
- Naturalism
- Monism
- Philosophical pessimism
- Platonic idealism
- Hindu idealism
- Phenomenalism
- Nihilism
- Realism
- Physicalism
- MOQ
- Relativism
- Scientific realism
- Solipsism
- Subjectivism
- Objectivism
- Substance theory
- Type theory
- Emergentism
- Emanationism

=== Political philosophies ===
- Anarchism
- Authoritarianism
- Communitarianism
- Conservatism
- Fascism
- Liberalism
- Libertarianism
- Social democracy
- Socialism
- Communism

=== Philosophy of language theories and stances ===
- Causal theory of reference
- Contrast theory of meaning
- Contrastivism
- Conventionalism
- Cratylism
- Deconstruction
- Descriptivist theory of names
- Direct reference theory
- Dramatism
- Expressivism
- Linguistic determinism
- Logical atomism
- Mediated reference theory
- Nominalism
- Non-cognitivism
- Phallogocentrism
- Quietism
- Relevance theory
- Semantic externalism
- Semantic holism
- Structuralism
- Supposition theory
- Symbiosism
- Theological noncognitivism
- Theory of descriptions
- Verification theory

=== Philosophy of mind ===
- Behaviourism
- Biological naturalism
- Consciousness
- Disjunctivism
- Dualism
- Eliminative materialism
- Emergent materialism
- Enactivism
- Epiphenomenalism
- Functionalism
- Identity theory
- Idealism
- Interactionism
- Materialism
- Monism
- Neutral monism
- Panpsychism
- Phenomenalism
- Phenomenology
- Physicalism
- Property dualism
- Representational theory of mind
- Sense datum theory
- Solipsism
- Substance dualism
- Qualia theory

=== Philosophy of religion stances ===
- Theories of religion
- Acosmism
- Agnosticism
- Animism
- Antireligion
- Atheism
- Dharmism
- Deism
- Divine command theory
- Dualistic cosmology
- Esotericism
- Exclusivism
- Existentialism
  - Christian
  - Agnostic
  - Atheist
- Feminist theology
- Fideism
- Fundamentalism
- Gnosticism
- Henotheism
- Humanism
  - Religious
  - Secular
  - Christian
- Inclusivism
- Monism
- Monotheism
- Mysticism
- Naturalism
  - Metaphysical
  - Religious
  - Humanistic
- New Age
- Nondualism
- Nontheism
- Pandeism
- Pantheism
- Perennialism
- Polytheism
- Process theology
- Spiritualism
- Shamanism
- Taoic
- Theism
- Transcendentalism

=== Philosophy of science theories and stances ===
- Confirmation holism
- Coherentism
- Contextualism
- Conventionalism
- Deductive-nomological model
- Determinism
- Empiricism
- Fallibilism
- Foundationalism
- Hypothetico-deductive model
- Infinitism
- Instrumentalism
- Positivism
- Pragmatism
- Rationalism
- Received view of theories
- Reductionism
- Semantic view of theories
- Scientific realism
- Scientism
- Scientific anti-realism
- Skepticism
- Uniformitarianism
- Vitalism

== Philosophical literature ==
=== Reference works ===
- Encyclopedia of Philosophy – one of the major English encyclopedias of philosophy. The second edition, edited by Donald M. Borchert, was published in ten volumes in 2006 by Thomson Gale. Volumes 1–9 contain alphabetically ordered articles.
- Internet Encyclopedia of Philosophy – a free online encyclopedia on philosophical topics and philosophers founded by James Fieser in 1995. The current general editors are James Fieser (Professor of Philosophy at the University of Tennessee at Martin) and Bradley Dowden (Professor of Philosophy at California State University, Sacramento). The staff also includes numerous area editors as well as volunteers.
- Routledge Encyclopedia of Philosophy – encyclopedia of philosophy edited by Edward Craig that was first published by Routledge in 1998 (ISBN 978-0415073103). Originally published in both 10 volumes of print and as a CD-ROM, in 2002 it was made available online on a subscription basis. The online version is regularly updated with new articles and revisions to existing articles. It has 1,300 contributors providing over 2,000 scholarly articles.
- Stanford Encyclopedia of Philosophy – combines an online encyclopedia of philosophy with peer reviewed publication of original papers in philosophy, freely-accessible to internet users. Each entry is written and maintained by an expert in the field, including professors from many academic institutions worldwide.
- Chan, Wing-tsit (1963). A Source Book in Chinese Philosophy. Princeton University Press. ISBN 978-0-691-01964-2.
- Huang, Siu-chi (1999). Essentials of Neo-Confucianism: Eight Major Philosophers of the Song and Ming Periods. Greenwood Publishing Group. ISBN 978-0-313-26449-8.
- The Cambridge Dictionary of Philosophy by Robert Audi
- Edwards, Paul, ed. (1967). The Encyclopedia of Philosophy. Macmillan & Free Press.; in 1996, a ninth supplemental volume appeared that updated the classic 1967 encyclopedia.
- International Directory of Philosophy and Philosophers. Charlottesville, Philosophy Documentation Center.
- Directory of American Philosophers. Charlottesville, Philosophy Documentation Center.
- Routledge History of Philosophy (10 vols.) edited by John Marenbon
- History of Philosophy (9 vols.) by Frederick Copleston
- A History of Western Philosophy (5 vols.) by W.T. Jones
- History of Italian Philosophy (2 vols.) by Eugenio Garin. Translated from Italian and Edited by Giorgio Pinton. Introduction by Leon Pompa.
- Encyclopaedia of Indian Philosophies (8 vols.), edited by Karl H. Potter et al. (first 6 volumes out of print)
- Indian Philosophy (2 vols.) by Sarvepalli Radhakrishnan
- A History of Indian Philosophy (5 vols.) by Surendranath Dasgupta
- History of Chinese Philosophy (2 vols.) by Fung Yu-lan, Derk Bodde
- Instructions for Practical Living and Other Neo-Confucian Writings by Wang Yang-ming by Chan, Wing-tsit
- Encyclopedia of Chinese Philosophy edited by Antonio S. Cua
- Encyclopedia of Eastern Philosophy and Religion by Ingrid Fischer-Schreiber, Franz-Karl Ehrhard, Kurt Friedrichs
- Companion Encyclopedia of Asian Philosophy by Brian Carr, Indira Mahalingam
- A Concise Dictionary of Indian Philosophy: Sanskrit Terms Defined in English by John A. Grimes
- History of Islamic Philosophy edited by Seyyed Hossein Nasr, Oliver Leaman
- History of Jewish Philosophy edited by Daniel H. Frank, Oliver Leaman
- A History of Russian Philosophy: From the Tenth to the Twentieth Centuries by Valerii Aleksandrovich Kuvakin
- Ayer, A.J. et al., Ed. (1994) A Dictionary of Philosophical Quotations. Blackwell Reference Oxford. Oxford, Basil Blackwell Ltd.
- Blackburn, S., Ed. (1996)The Oxford Dictionary of Philosophy. Oxford, Oxford University Press.
- Mautner, T., Ed. The Penguin Dictionary of Philosophy. London, Penguin Books.
- Runes, D., ed. (1942). The Dictionary of Philosophy. New York: The Philosophical Library, Inc. Archived from the original on 24 April 2014.
- Angeles, P.A., Ed. (1992). The HarperCollins Dictionary of Philosophy. New York, Harper Perennial.
- Bunnin, Nicholas; Tsui-James, Eric, eds. (15 April 2008). The Blackwell Companion to Philosophy. John Wiley & Sons. ISBN 978-0-470-99787-1.
- Hoffman, Eric, Ed. (1997) Guidebook for Publishing Philosophy. Charlottesville, Philosophy Documentation Center.
- Popkin, R.H. (1999). The Columbia History of Western Philosophy. New York, Columbia University Press.
- Bullock, Alan, and Oliver Stallybrass, jt. eds. The Harper Dictionary of Modern Thought. New York: Harper & Row, 1977. xix, 684 p. N.B.: First published in England under the title, "The Fontana Dictionary of Modern Thought". ISBN 978-0-06-010578-5
- Reese, W.L. Dictionary of Philosophy and Religion: Eastern and Western Thought. Atlantic Highlands, N.J.: Humanities Press, 1980. iv, 644 p. ISBN 978-0-391-00688-1

=== General introduction ===
- Aristotle (1941). Richard McKeon (ed.). The Basic Works of Aristotle. New York: Random House.
- Blumenau, Ralph. Philosophy and Living. ISBN 978-0-907845-33-1
- Craig, Edward. Philosophy: A Very Short Introduction. ISBN 978-0-19-285421-6
- Harrison-Barbet, Anthony, Mastering Philosophy. ISBN 978-0-333-69343-8
- Russell, Bertrand. The Problems of Philosophy. ISBN 978-0-19-511552-9
- Sinclair, Alistair J. What is Philosophy? An Introduction, 2008, ISBN 978-1-903765-94-4
- Sober, Elliott. (2001). Core Questions in Philosophy: A Text with Readings. Upper Saddle River, Prentice Hall. ISBN 978-0-13-189869-1
- Solomon, Robert C. Big Questions: A Short Introduction to Philosophy. ISBN 978-0-534-16708-0
- Warburton, Nigel. Philosophy: The Basics. ISBN 978-0-415-14694-4
- Nagel, Thomas. What Does It All Mean? A Very Short Introduction to Philosophy. ISBN 978-0-19-505292-3
- Classics of Philosophy (Vols. 1, 2, & 3) by Louis P. Pojman
- Cottingham, John. Western Philosophy: An Anthology. 2nd ed. Malden, MA: Blackwell Pub., 2008. Print. Blackwell Philosophy Anthologies.
- Tarnas, Richard. The Passion of the Western Mind: Understanding the Ideas That Have Shaped Our World View. ISBN 978-0-345-36809-6

=== Topical introductions ===
==== African ====
- Imbo, Samuel Oluoch. An Introduction to African Philosophy. ISBN 978-0-8476-8841-8

==== Eastern ====
- A Source Book in Indian Philosophy by Sarvepalli Radhakrishnan, Charles A. Moore
- Hamilton, Sue. Indian Philosophy: a Very Short Introduction. ISBN 978-0-19-285374-5
- Kupperman, Joel J. Classic Asian Philosophy: A Guide to the Essential Texts. ISBN 978-0-19-513335-6
- Lee, Joe and Powell, Jim. Eastern Philosophy For Beginners. ISBN 978-0-86316-282-4
- Smart, Ninian. World Philosophies. ISBN 978-0-415-22852-7
- Copleston, Frederick. Philosophy in Russia: From Herzen to Lenin and Berdyaev. ISBN 978-0-268-01569-5

==== Islamic ====
- Medieval Islamic Philosophical Writings edited by Muhammad Ali Khalidi
- Leaman, Oliver (2000-04-14). A Brief Introduction to Islamic Philosophy. Wiley. ISBN 978-0-7456-1960-6.
- Corbin, Henry (23 June 2014) [1993]. History Of Islamic Philosophy. Translated by Sherrard, Liadain; Sherrard, Philip. Taylor & Francis. ISBN 978-1-135-19888-6.
- Aminrazavi, Mehdi Amin Razavi; Nasr, Seyyed Hossein; Nasr, PH.D., Seyyed Hossein (16 December 2013). The Islamic Intellectual Tradition in Persia. Routledge. ISBN 978-1-136-78105-6.

=== Historical introductions ===
==== General ====
- Oizerman, Teodor (1988). The Main Trends in Philosophy. A Theoretical Analysis of the History of Philosophy (PDF). translated by H. Campbell Creighton, M.A., Oxon (2nd ed.). Moscow: Progress Publishers. ISBN 978-5-01-000506-1. Archived from the original (DjVu, etc.) on 2012-03-06. File not found 2026-10-23. First published in Russian as Главные философские направления.
- Higgins, Kathleen M. and Solomon, Robert C. A Short History of Philosophy. ISBN 978-0-19-510196-6
- Durant, Will, Story of Philosophy: The Lives and Opinions of the World's Greatest Philosophers, Pocket, 1991, ISBN 978-0-671-73916-4
- Oizerman, Teodor (1973). Problems of the History of Philosophy. translated from Russian by Robert Daglish (1st ed.). Moscow: Progress Publishers. Archived from the original on 6 July 2011. First published in Russian as Проблемы историко-философской науки.

==== Ancient ====
- Knight, Kelvin. Aristotelian Philosophy: Ethics and Politics from Aristotle to MacIntyre. ISBN 978-0-7456-1977-4

==== Medieval ====
- The Phenomenology Reader by Dermot Moran, Timothy Mooney
- Kim, J. and Ernest Sosa, Ed. (1999). Metaphysics: An Anthology. Blackwell Philosophy Anthologies. Oxford, Blackwell Publishers Ltd.
- Husserl, Edmund; Welton, Donn (1999). The Essential Husserl: Basic Writings in Transcendental Phenomenology. Indiana University Press. ISBN 978-0-253-21273-3.

==== Modern and contemporary ====
- The English Philosophers from Bacon to Mill by Edwin Arthur
- European Philosophers from Descartes to Nietzsche by Monroe Beardsley
- Existentialism: Basic Writings (Second Edition) by Charles Guignon, Derk Pereboom
- Curley, Edwin, A Spinoza Reader, Princeton, 1994, ISBN 978-0-691-00067-1
- Bullock, Alan, R.B. Woodings, and John Cumming, eds. The Fontana Dictionary of Modern Thinkers, in series, Fontana Original[s]. Hammersmith, Eng.: Fontana Press, 1992 [1983]. xxv, 867 p. ISBN 978-0-00-636965-3
- Scruton, Roger. A Short History of Modern Philosophy. ISBN 978-0-415-26763-2
- Contemporary Analytic Philosophy: Core Readings by James Baillie
- Appiah, Kwame Anthony. Thinking it Through – An Introduction to Contemporary Philosophy, 2003, ISBN 978-0-19-513458-2
- Critchley, Simon. Continental Philosophy: A Very Short Introduction. ISBN 978-0-19-285359-2

== Lists ==
- List of important publications in philosophy
- List of philosophy awards
- Lists of philosophers
- Index of philosophy
- Index of philosophy of science articles
- Timeline of Western philosophers
- Timeline of Eastern philosophers
- Unsolved problems in philosophy

== See also ==
- Outline of ethics
- Outline of logic
- Outline of philosophy of artificial intelligence
