= Commutativity of conjunction =

Property where statement order does not matter

In propositional logic, the commutativity of conjunction is a valid argument form and truth-functional tautology. It is considered to be a law of classical logic. It is the principle that the conjuncts of a logical conjunction may switch places with each other, while preserving the truth-value of the resulting proposition.

== Formal notation ==
Commutativity of conjunction can be expressed in sequent notation as:

$$(P \land Q) \vdash (Q \land P)$$

and

$$(Q \land P) \vdash (P \land Q)$$

where $\vdash$ is a metalogical symbol meaning that $(Q \land P)$ is a syntactic consequence of $(P \land Q)$, in the one case, and $(P \land Q)$ is a syntactic consequence of $(Q \land P)$ in the other, in some logical system;

or in rule form:

$$\frac{P \land Q}{\therefore Q \land P}$$

and

$$\frac{Q \land P}{\therefore P \land Q}$$

where the rule is that wherever an instance of "$(P \land Q)$" appears on a line of a proof, it can be replaced with "$(Q \land P)$" and wherever an instance of "$(Q \land P)$" appears on a line of a proof, it can be replaced with "$(P \land Q)$";

or as the statement of a truth-functional tautology or theorem of propositional logic:

$$(P \land Q) \to (Q \land P)$$

and

$$(Q \land P) \to (P \land Q)$$

where $P$ and $Q$ are propositions expressed in some formal system.

== Generalized principle ==
For any propositions H_{1}, H_{2}, ... H_{n}, and permutation σ(n) of the numbers 1 through n, it is the case that:

H_{1} $\land$ H_{2} $\land$ ... $\land$ H_{n}

is equivalent to

H_{σ(1)} $\land$ H_{σ(2)} $\land$ H_{σ(n)}.

For example, if H_{1} is

It is raining

H_{2} is

Socrates is mortal

and H_{3} is

2+2=4

then
It is raining and Socrates is mortal and 2+2=4
is equivalent to
Socrates is mortal and 2+2=4 and it is raining
and the other orderings of the predicates.
