= Outline of discrete mathematics =

Overview of and topical guide to discrete mathematics

Discrete mathematics is the study of mathematical structures that are fundamentally discrete rather than continuous. In contrast to real numbers that have the property of varying "smoothly", the objects studied in discrete mathematics – such as integers, graphs, and statements in logic – do not vary smoothly in this way, but have distinct, separated values. Discrete mathematics, therefore, excludes topics in "continuous mathematics" such as calculus and analysis.

Included below are many of the standard terms used routinely in university-level courses and in research papers. This is not, however, intended as a complete list of mathematical terms; just a selection of typical terms of art that may be encountered.

- Logic – Study of correct reasoning & Proofs – Reasoning for mathematical statements
- Set theory – Branch of mathematics that studies sets
- Functions – Association of one output to each input
- Linear algebra – Branch of mathematics
- Algorithmics – Sequence of operations for a task
- Computational complexity theory – Inherent difficulty of computational problems
- Number theory – Branch of pure mathematics
- Proofs – Reasoning for mathematical statements
- Combinatorics – Branch of discrete mathematics
- Probability – Number measuring the chance an event occurs & Probability theory – Branch of mathematics concerning probability
- Relation – Relationship between two sets, defined by a set of ordered pairs & Partially ordered set – Mathematical set with an ordering
- Graph theory – Area of discrete mathematics
- Computability – Ability to solve a problem by an effective procedure
- Finite mathematics – Syllabus in college and university mathematics
- Digital geometry – Deals with digitized models or images of objects of the 2D or 3D Euclidean space
- Digital topology – Properties of 2D or 3D digital images that correspond to classic topological properties
- Information theory – Scientific study of digital information
- Markov chains – Random process independent of past history
- Modal logic – Type of formal logic

== Discrete mathematical disciplines ==
For further reading in discrete mathematics, beyond a basic level, see these pages. Many of these disciplines are closely related to computer science.

- Automata theory – Study of abstract machines and automata
- Coding theory – Study of the properties of codes and their fitness
- Combinatorics – Branch of discrete mathematics
- Computational geometry – Branch of computer science
- Digital geometry – Deals with digitized models or images of objects of the 2D or 3D Euclidean space
- Discrete geometry – Branch of geometry that studies combinatorial properties and constructive methods
- Graph theory – Area of discrete mathematics a study of graphs – Vertices connected in pairs by edges
- Mathematical logic – Subfield of mathematics
- Discrete optimization – Branch of mathematical optimization
- Set theory – Branch of mathematics that studies sets
- Number theory – Branch of pure mathematics
- Information theory – Scientific study of digital information
- Game theory – Mathematical models of strategic interactions

== Concepts in discrete mathematics ==
=== Sets ===
- Set (mathematics) – Collection of mathematical objects
  - Element (mathematics) – Any one of the distinct objects that make up a set in set theory
  - Venn diagram – Diagram that shows all possible logical relations between a collection of sets
  - Empty set – Mathematical set containing no elements
  - Subset – Set whose elements all belong to another set
  - Union (set theory) – Set of elements in any of some sets
    - Disjoint union – In mathematics, operation on sets
  - Intersection (set theory) – Set of elements common to all of some sets
    - Disjoint sets – Sets with no element in common
  - Complement (set theory) – Set of the elements not in a given subset
  - Symmetric difference – Elements in exactly one of two sets
- Ordered pair – Pair of mathematical objects
- Cartesian product – Mathematical set formed from two given sets
- Power set – Mathematical set of all subsets of a set
- Simple theorems in the algebra of sets – Basic set identities like commutative and associative laws
- Naive set theory – Informal set theories
- Multiset – Mathematical set with repetitions allowed

=== Functions ===
- Function – Association of one output to each input
- Domain of a function – Set of all things that may be the input of a mathematical function
- Codomain – Target set of a mathematical function
- Range of a function – Subset of a function's codomain
- Image (mathematics) – Set of the values of a function
- Injective function – Function that preserves distinctness
- Surjection – Mathematical function such that every output has at least one input
- Bijection – One-to-one correspondence
- Function composition – Operation on mathematical functions
- Partial function – Function whose actual domain of definition may be smaller than its apparent domain
- Multivalued function – Generalized mathematical function
- Binary function – Function that takes two inputs
- Floor function – Nearest integers from a number
- Sign function – Function returning minus 1, zero or plus 1
- Inclusion map – Set-theoretic function
- Pigeonhole principle – Theorem in combinatorics
- Relation composition – Operation on binary relations
- Permutations – Mathematical version of an order change
- Symmetry – Mathematical invariance under transformations

=== Arithmetic ===
- Decimal – Number in base-10 numeral system
- Binary numeral system – Number expressed in the base-2 numeral system
- Divisor – Integer that divides another integer
- Division by zero – Class of mathematical expression
- Indeterminate form – Expression in mathematical analysis
- Empty product – Result from multiplying no factors
- Euclidean algorithm – Algorithm for computing greatest common divisors
- Fundamental theorem of arithmetic – Integers have unique prime factorizations
- Modular arithmetic – Computation modulo a fixed integer
- Successor function – Elementary operation on a natural number

=== Elementary algebra ===
Elementary algebra – Basic concepts of algebra

- Left-hand side and right-hand side of an equation – Mathematical nomenclature
- Linear equation – Equation that does not involve powers or products of variables
- Quadratic equation – Polynomial equation of degree two
- Solution point – Mathematical formula expressing equality
- Arithmetic progression – Sequence of equally spaced numbers
- Recurrence relation – Pattern defining an infinite sequence of numbers
- Finite difference – Discrete analog of a derivative
- Difference operator – Pattern defining an infinite sequence of numbers
- Groups – Set with associative invertible operation
- Group isomorphism – Bijective group homomorphism
- Subgroups – Subset of a group that forms a group itself
- Fermat's little theorem – A prime p divides a^p–a for any integer a
- Cryptography – Practice and study of secure communication techniques
- Faulhaber's formula – Expression for sums of powers

=== Mathematical relations ===
- Binary relation – Relationship between elements of two sets
- Heterogeneous relation – Relationship between elements of two sets
- Reflexive relation – Binary relation that relates every element to itself
- Reflexive property of equality – Basic notion of sameness in mathematics
- Symmetric relation – Type of binary relation
- Symmetric property of equality – Basic notion of sameness in mathematics
- Antisymmetric relation – Type of binary relation
- Transitivity (mathematics) – Type of binary relation
  - Transitive closure – Smallest transitive relation containing a given binary relation
  - Transitive property of equality – Basic notion of sameness in mathematics
- Equivalence and identity
  - Equivalence relation – Mathematical concept for comparing objects
  - Equivalence class – Mathematical concept
  - Equality (mathematics) – Basic notion of sameness in mathematics
    - Inequation – Mathematical statement that two values are not equal
    - Inequality (mathematics) – Mathematical relation making a non-equal comparison
  - Similarity (geometry) – Property of objects which are scaled or mirrored versions of each other
  - Congruence (geometry) – Relationship between two figures of the same shape and size, or mirroring each other
  - Equation – Mathematical formula expressing equality
  - Identity (mathematics) – Equation that is satisfied for all values of the variables
    - Identity element – Specific element of an algebraic structure
    - Identity function – Function that returns its argument unchanged
  - Substitution property of equality – Basic notion of sameness in mathematics
  - Graphing equivalence
  - Extensionality – Logic principle
  - Uniqueness quantification – Logical quantifier

=== Mathematical phraseology ===
- If and only if – Logical connective
- Necessary and sufficient – Terms to describe a conditional relationship between two statements
- Distinct – Basic notion of sameness in mathematics
- Difference – One of the four basic arithmetic operations
- Absolute value – Distance from zero to a number
- Up to – Mathematical statement of uniqueness, except for an equivalent structure
- Modular arithmetic – Computation modulo a fixed integer
- Characterization (mathematics) – Term in mathematics
- Normal form – Standard representation of a mathematical object
- Canonical form – Standard representation of a mathematical object
- Without loss of generality – Expression in mathematics
- Vacuous truth – Conditional statement which is true because the antecedent cannot be satisfied
- Contradiction – Logical incompatibility between two or more propositions, Reductio ad absurdum – Argument that leads to a logical absurdity
- Counterexample – Exception to a proposed general rule
- Sufficiently large
- Pons asinorum – Geometric theorem about isosceles triangles
- Table of mathematical symbols
- Contrapositive – Mathematical logic concept
- Mathematical induction – Form of mathematical proof

=== Combinatorics ===
Combinatorics – Branch of discrete mathematics

- Permutations and combinations – Selection of items from a set
- Permutation – Mathematical version of an order change
- Combination – Selection of items from a set
- Factorial – Product of numbers from 1 to n
  - Empty product – Result from multiplying no factors
- Pascal's triangle – Triangular array of the binomial coefficients
- Combinatorial proof – Proofs in enumerative combinatorics
  - Bijective proof – Technique for proving sets have equal size
  - Double counting (proof technique) – Type of proof technique

=== Probability ===
Probability – Number measuring the chance an event occurs

- Average – Number taken as representative of a list of numbers
- Expected value – Average value of a random variable
- Discrete random variable – Variable representing a random phenomenon
- Sample space – Set of all possible outcomes or results of a statistical trial or experiment
- Event – In statistics and probability theory, set of outcomes to which a probability is assigned
- Conditional Probability – Probability of an event occurring, given that another event has already occurred
- Independence – When the occurrence of one event does not affect the likelihood of another
- Random variables – Variable representing a random phenomenon

=== Propositional logic ===
- Logical operator – Symbol connecting formulas in logic
- Truth table – Mathematical table used in logic
- De Morgan's laws – Pair of logical equivalences
- Open sentence – Formula that contains at least one free variable
- List of topics in logic – Overview of and topical guide to logic

== Mathematicians associated with discrete mathematics ==
- Paul Erdős – Hungarian mathematician (1913–1996)
- Leonhard Euler - Swiss mathematician (1707-1783)
- Claude Shannon - American mathematician (1916-2001)
- Donald Knuth - American mathematician and computer scientist (b. 1938)
- Frank P. Ramsey - British philosopher, mathematician and economist (1903-1930)
- Arthur Cayley - English mathematician (1821-1895)
