= Epicheireme =

An epicheireme (/ɛpiˈkaɪrim/ e-pee-KEYE-reem) (Note: plural "epicheirema" /ɛpikaɪˈrimə/ e-pee-keye-REEM-ə) is a compound syllogism in which at least one of the premises is stated along with a justification for itself. Epicheirema are abridged polysyllogisms. Like the enthymeme, epicheirema are often used in everyday speech.

== Basic form ==
An epicheireme is a compound syllogism in which at least one of the premises is stated along with a justification for itself. The justificatory portion is referred to as a causal proposition, and is usually introduced by the words "for", "since", or "because". An example of an epicheireme is as follows, with the causal proposition marked in bold italics:

All waiters are beneficent because they cater to the needs of their customers.
Darryl is a waiter.
Therefore, Darryl is beneficent.

== Three kinds of epicheirema ==
Epicheirema are categorized in three varieties, depending on which premise (or premises) contain a causal proposition. In a first order epicheireme, the causal proposition is in the major premise.

First Order Epicheireme

All M are P, since r
S is M
Therefore, S is P

(where r is the justification for the proposition that precedes it)

In a second order epicheireme, the causal proposition is in the minor premise.

Second Order Epicheireme

All M are P
S is M, since r
Therefore, S is P

In a third order epicheireme, there are causal propositions in both premises.

Third Order Epicheireme

All M are P, since r_{1}
S is M, since r_{2}
Therefore, S is P

A concrete example of a third order epicheireme is as follows:

All waiters are beneficent because they cater to the needs of their customers.
Darryl is a waiter since Darryl serves tables at Chez Casimir
Therefore, Darryl is beneficent.
