= First-order predicate =

Logical statement with variables, predicates, and quantifiers over objects

In mathematical logic, a first-order predicate is a predicate that takes only individual(s) constants or variables as argument(s). Compare second-order predicate and higher-order predicate.

This is not to be confused with a one-place predicate or monad, which is a predicate that takes only one argument. For example, the expression "is a planet" is a one-place predicate, while the expression "is father of" is a two-place predicate.

== See also ==
- First-order predicate calculus
- Monadic predicate calculus
