= Metalogic =

Study of the properties of logical systems

Metalogic is the metatheory of logic. Whereas logic studies how logical systems can be used to construct valid and sound arguments, metalogic studies the properties of logical systems. Logic concerns the truths that may be derived using a logical system; metalogic concerns the truths that may be derived about the languages and systems that are used to express truths.

The basic objects of metalogical study are formal languages, formal systems, and their interpretations. The study of interpretation of formal systems is the branch of mathematical logic that is known as model theory, and the study of deductive systems is the branch that is known as proof theory.

== Overview ==
=== Formal language ===
A formal language is an organized set of symbols, the symbols of which precisely define it by shape and place. Such a language therefore can be defined without reference to the meanings of its expressions; it can exist before any interpretation is assigned to it—that is, before it has any meaning. First-order logic is expressed in some formal language. A formal grammar determines which symbols and sets of symbols are formulas in a formal language.

A formal language can be formally defined as a set A of strings (finite sequences) on a fixed alphabet α. Some authors, including Rudolf Carnap, define the language as the ordered pair <α, A>. Carnap also requires that each element of α must occur in at least one string in A.

=== Formation rules ===
Formation rules (also called formal grammar) are a precise description of the well-formed formulas of a formal language. They are synonymous with the set of strings over the alphabet of the formal language that constitute well formed formulas. However, it does not describe their semantics (i.e. what they mean).

=== Formal systems ===
A formal system (also called a logical calculus, or a logical system) consists of a formal language together with a deductive apparatus (also called a deductive system). The deductive apparatus may consist of a set of transformation rules (also called inference rules) or a set of axioms, or have both. A formal system is used to derive one expression from one or more other expressions.

A formal system can be formally defined as an ordered triple <α,$\mathcal{I}$,$\mathcal{D}$d>, where $\mathcal{D}$d is the relation of direct derivability. This relation is understood in a comprehensive sense such that the primitive sentences of the formal system are taken as directly derivable from the empty set of sentences. Direct derivability is a relation between a sentence and a finite, possibly empty set of sentences. Axioms are so chosen that every first place member of $\mathcal{D}$d is a member of $\mathcal{I}$ and every second place member is a finite subset of $\mathcal{I}$.

A formal system can also be defined with only the relation $\mathcal{D}$d. Thereby can be omitted $\mathcal{I}$ and α in the definitions of interpreted formal language, and interpreted formal system. However, this method can be more difficult to understand and use.

=== Formal proofs ===
A formal proof is a sequence of well-formed formulas of a formal language, the last of which is a theorem of a formal system. The theorem is a syntactic consequence of all the well formed formulae that precede it in the proof system. For a well formed formula to qualify as part of a proof, it must result from applying a rule of the deductive apparatus of some formal system to the previous well formed formulae in the proof sequence.

=== Interpretations ===
An interpretation of a formal system is the assignment of meanings to the symbols and truth-values to the sentences of the formal system. The study of interpretations is called Formal semantics. Giving an interpretation is synonymous with constructing a model.

== Important distinctions ==
=== Metalanguage–object language ===
In metalogic, formal languages are sometimes called object languages. The language used to make statements about an object language is called a metalanguage. This distinction is a key difference between logic and metalogic. While logic deals with proofs in a formal system, expressed in some formal language, metalogic deals with proofs about a formal system which are expressed in a metalanguage about some object language.

=== Syntax–semantics ===
In metalogic, 'syntax' has to do with formal languages or formal systems without regard to any interpretation of them, whereas, 'semantics' has to do with interpretations of formal languages. The term 'syntactic' has a slightly wider scope than 'proof-theoretic', since it may be applied to properties of formal languages without any deductive systems, as well as to formal systems. 'Semantic' is synonymous with 'model-theoretic'.

=== Use–mention ===
In metalogic, the words use and mention, in both their noun and verb forms, take on a technical sense in order to identify an important distinction. The use–mention distinction (sometimes referred to as the words-as-words distinction) is the distinction between using a word (or phrase) and mentioning it. Usually it is indicated that an expression is being mentioned rather than used by enclosing it in quotation marks, printing it in italics, or setting the expression by itself on a line. The enclosing in quotes of an expression gives us the name of an expression, for example:

"Metalogic" is the name of this article.
This article is about metalogic.

=== Type–token ===
The type-token distinction is a distinction in metalogic, that separates an abstract concept from the objects which are particular instances of the concept. For example, the particular bicycle in your garage is a token of the type of thing known as "The bicycle." Whereas, the bicycle in your garage is in a particular place at a particular time, that is not true of "the bicycle" as used in the sentence: "The bicycle has become more popular recently." This distinction is used to clarify the meaning of symbols of formal languages.

== History ==
Metalogical questions have been asked since the time of Aristotle. However, it was only with the rise of formal languages in the late 19th and early 20th century that investigations into the foundations of logic began to flourish. In 1904, David Hilbert observed that in investigating the foundations of mathematics that logical notions are presupposed, and therefore a simultaneous account of metalogical and metamathematical principles was required. Today, metalogic and metamathematics are largely synonymous with each other, and both have been substantially subsumed by mathematical logic in academia. A possible alternate, less mathematical model may be found in the writings of Charles Sanders Peirce and other semioticians.

== Results ==
Results in metalogic primally involve demonstrating properties of particular formal systems. Key properties include consistency, completeness, and decidability. Other results are important to metalogic more for providing a tool utilized frequently in proving subsequent results. For example, the proof the uncountability of the power set of the natural numbers (Cantor's theorem 1891) which introduced the technique of diagonalization.

Major completeness or incompleteness results include:

- Completeness of truth-functional propositional logic (Paul Bernays 1918), (Emil Post 1920)
- Completeness of first-order monadic predicate logic (Leopold Löwenheim 1915)
- Completeness of first-order predicate logic (Gödel's completeness theorem 1930)
- Gödel's first incompleteness theorem 1931
- Gödel's second incompleteness theorem 1931

Major consistency results include:

- Consistency of truth-functional propositional logic (Emil Post 1920),
- Consistency of first-order monadic predicate logic (Leopold Löwenheim 1915)
- Consistency of first-order predicate logic (David Hilbert and Wilhelm Ackermann 1928)

Major decidability results include:

- Decidability of truth-functional propositional logic (Emil Post 1920)
- Decidability of first-order monadic predicate logic (Leopold Löwenheim 1915)
- Undecidability of first-order predicate logic (Church's theorem 1936)

Other important meta logic results include:

- Existence of models of arbitrary infinite cardinality for countable first-order theories with an infinite model, Löwenheim–Skolem theorem (Leopold Löwenheim 1915 and Thoralf Skolem 1919)
- Proof of the cut-elimination theorem for the sequent calculus (Gentzen's Hauptsatz 1934)
- Tarski's undefinability theorem (Gödel and Tarski in the 1930s)

== See also ==
- Metalogic programming
- Metamathematics
