= Nonstandard (disambiguation) =

Nonstandard describes a state not conforming to standards.

Nonstandard or non-standard may also refer to:

- non-standard analysis, the use of infinitesimals to formulate calculus
- non-standard model, in model theory, a model that is not isomorphic to the standard model, especially models of Peano arithmetic
- non-standard cosmology, models which do not conform to current scientific consensus
