= Metatheorem =

Logic statement about a formal system proven in a metalanguage

In logic, a metatheorem is a statement about a formal system proven in a metalanguage. Unlike theorems proved within a given formal system, a metatheorem is proved within a metatheory, and may reference concepts that are present in the metatheory but not the object theory.

A formal system is determined by a formal language and a deductive system (axioms and rules of inference). The formal system can be used to prove particular sentences of the formal language with that system. Metatheorems, however, are proved externally to the system in question, in its metatheory. Common metatheories used in logic are set theory (especially in model theory) and primitive recursive arithmetic (especially in proof theory). Rather than demonstrating particular sentences to be provable, metatheorems may show that each of a broad class of sentences can be proved, or show that certain sentences cannot be proved.

== Examples ==
Examples of metatheorems include:

- The deduction theorem for first-order logic says that a sentence of the form φ→ψ is provable from a set of axioms A if and only if the sentence ψ is provable from the system whose axioms consist of φ and all the axioms of A.
- The class existence theorem of von Neumann–Bernays–Gödel set theory states that for every formula whose quantifiers range only over sets, there is a class consisting of the sets satisfying the formula.
- Consistency proofs of systems such as Peano arithmetic.
- Gödel's completeness theorem states that first-order logic is complete.

== See also ==
- Metamathematics
- Use–mention distinction
