= Akan philosophy =

Philosophy of West African ethnic group

Akan philosophy is a form of African philosophy in the conceptual system of Akan people, a meta-ethnic group native to West Africa. In contemporary work, Akan philosophy has been most influential in metaphysical and ethical discussion of the concept of personhood. In common with other strands of African philosophy, Akan philosophers such as Kwasi Wiredu have developed the view that personhood exists in degrees such that "personhood is something for a human to become to different degrees through individual achievement".
