= Subalternation =

Immediate inference concept in logic

Subalternation is an immediate inference which is only made between A (All S are P) and I (Some S are P) categorical propositions and between E (No S are P or originally, No S is P) and O (Some S are not P or originally, Not every S is P) categorical propositions of the traditional square of opposition and the original square of opposition. If the A proposition is true we may immediately infer that I is true. If the E proposition is true we may immediately infer that O is true. Conversely, If the I is false, we can immediately infer that A is also false, as well as if O is false, then E is false. However, if the A proposition is false that will not tell us anything about the truth value of the I proposition. Similarly, if the E proposition is false, that will not tell us anything about the truth value of the O proposition.

An example of a subalternation is "If all leopards are mammals, then some leopards are mammals."

When the inference is misapplied, the syllogistic fallacy is called an illicit subalternation.
