= Absolute and relative terms =

The distinction between absolute and relative terms was introduced by Peter Unger in his 1971 paper A Defense of Skepticism and differentiates between terms that, in their most literal sense, don't admit of degrees (absolute terms) and those that do (relative terms). According to his account, the term "flat", for example, is absolute because a surface is either perfectly (or absolutely) flat or isn't flat at all. The terms "bumpy" or "curved", on the other hand, are relative because there is no such thing as "absolute bumpiness" or "absolute curvedness" (although in analytic geometry curvedness is quantified). A bumpy surface can always be made bumpier. A truly flat surface, however, can never be made flatter. Colloquially, he acknowledges, we do say things like "surface A is flatter than surface B", but this is just a shorter way of saying "surface A is closer to being flat than surface B". This paraphrasing, however, doesn't work for relative terms. Another important aspect of absolute terms, one that motivated this choice of terminology, is that they can always be modified by the term "absolutely". For example, it is quite natural to say "this surface is absolutely flat", but it would be very strange and barely even meaningful to say "this surface is absolutely bumpy".
