= Bradley Dowden =

American philosopher (born 1942)

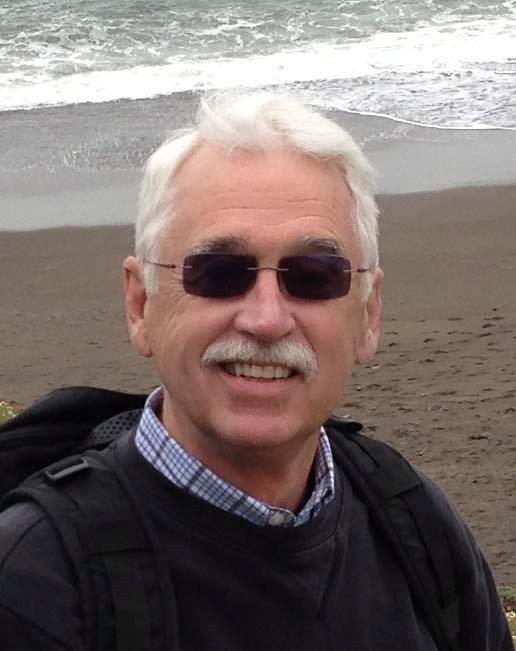
- Born: 1942 (age 83–84); Columbus, Ohio, U.S.

Education
- Thesis: A Theory of Truth: The Liar Paradox and Tarski's Undefinability Theorem (1979)

Philosophical work
- Era: Contemporary philosophy
- Region: Western philosophy
- School: Analytic philosophy
- Main interests: Philosophy of science, metaphysics, philosophy of mind, logic

Bradley Harris Dowden (born 1942) is an American philosopher and professor of philosophy at the California State University, Sacramento.

== Work ==
He is a general editor of the Internet Encyclopedia of Philosophy, supervising since 1999 a staff of 30 philosophy professors, each with their own subject area expertise. Subject area editors help the general editors recruit faculty to be referees, and they help settle disputes regarding conflicting suggestions for changes in submitted articles. The IEP is the world's most visited encyclopedia of entries written by philosophy faculty members with 6.9 million unique visitors per year. Dowden received his M.S. degree in physics from Ohio State University and his Ph.D. in philosophy from Stanford University. Among the IEP's 900 articles, he has written the (blind-refereed) articles on

- The Arrow of Time
- Time
- Zeno's Paradoxes
- Liar Paradox
- The Infinite
- Truth
- Fallacies

== Bibliography ==
- The Metaphysics of Time: A Dialogue (New Dialogues in Philosophy), Bradley Dowden, Rowman & Littlefield Publishers, 2009.
- Logical Reasoning, Bradley H. Dowden, Belmont CA: Wadsworth Publishing Co. 1993.
- “Accepting Inconsistencies from the Paradoxes.” Journal of Philosophical Logic 13, no. 2 (1984): 125–30. http://www.jstor.org/stable/30227024
