= Internet Encyclopedia of Philosophy =

Online peer-reviewed encyclopaedia

- Website type: Online encyclopedia
- Creator: James Fieser
- Editors: James Fieser; Bradley Dowden
- Website: iep.utm.edu
- Launched: 1995; 31 years ago
- ISSN: 2161-0002
- OCLC number: 37741658

The Internet Encyclopedia of Philosophy (IEP) is a scholarly online encyclopedia with around 900 articles about philosophy, philosophers, and related topics. The IEP publishes only peer-reviewed and blind-refereed original papers. Contribution is generally by invitation. Contributors come from 35 countries, according to the encyclopedia's "representative list", and are recognized as leading international specialists within their field.

== History ==
The IEP was founded by philosopher James Fieser in 1995, operating through a non-profit organization with the aim of providing accessible and scholarly information on philosophy. By the 2010s, the general editors were philosophers James Fieser and Bradley Dowden (since 1999), with a staff of thirty faculty members as subject-area editors plus numerous volunteers. The entire website was redesigned in 2009, transitioning to the open source and content management system known as WordPress. In 2025, it contained about 900 articles.

== Organization ==
The general editors supervise thirty subject-area editors, who help recruit authors and referees. The area editors supervise the blind-refereeing process. The intended audience for the IEP is philosophy students and faculty who are not specialists within the field, and thus articles are written in an accessible style. Articles consist of a brief survey or overview, followed by the body of the article, and an annotated bibliography. Articles are searchable either by an alphabetical index or through a Google-power search mechanism.

== Usage ==
During any twelve month period, it receives 8.2 million unique viewers, making it the most visited encyclopedia of professionally written philosophy articles. Similarweb analytics, as well as Google Analytics, say 75% of this usage is through internet searches, 18% is through direct access, and 5% through referral, with the referring websites including other reference websites and university library guides.

== Recognition ==
The IEP is included by the American Library Association in its listing of Best Free Reference Sites; listed as an online philosophy resource by the Federation of Australasian Philosophy in Schools Associations; listed by EpistemeLinks as one of the "outstanding resources" in philosophy on the internet; and listed as a reliable resource in many university philosophy guides.

== See also ==
- Routledge Encyclopedia of Philosophy
- Stanford Encyclopedia of Philosophy
- The Encyclopedia of Philosophy
- List of online encyclopedias
