= Topical logic =

Reasoning from commonplace topoi

Topical logic is the logic of topical argument, a branch of rhetoric developed in the Late Antique period from earlier works, such as Aristotle's Topics and Cicero's Topica. It consists of heuristics for developing arguments, which are in the first place plausible rather than rigorous, from commonplaces (topoi or loci). In other words, therefore, it consists of standardized ways of thinking up debating techniques from existing, thought-through positions. The actual practice of topical argument was much developed by Roman lawyers. Cicero took the theory of Aristotle to be an aspect of rhetoric. As such it belongs to inventio in the classic fivefold division of rhetoric.

The standard classical work on topical logic was the De Topicis Differentiis (On Topical Differentiae) by Boethius. Differentiae refer to case analysis, being the differentiations used to distinguish the cases into which a question is divided. Besides Aristotle and Cicero, Boethius built on Themistius. In terminology, the Greek axioma and topos in Boethius became the Latin maxima propositio (maxim, universal truth) and locus.

In the Middle Ages, topical logic became a theory of inference, for which the name "axiomatic topics" has been suggested. Abelard wanted to complete a theory of entailment by invoking the loci in Boethius to fill in conditionals, a flawed if bold development. Peter of Spain, in his De locis, developed the ideas of Boethius.

The De inventione dialectica of Rodolphus Agricola (1479) made large claims for this method as an aspect of dialectic (traditionally contrasted with rhetoric) subordinated to inventio. The precise relationship of "dialectic" and "rhetoric" remained vexed well into the sixteenth century, hinging on the role assigned to loci. It was expounded in different fashions by Philipp Melanchthon and Petrus Ramus. The debate fed into the later development of Ramism.

== See also ==
- Enthymeme
