= Propositional variable =

Variable that can either be true or false

In mathematical logic, a propositional variable (also called a sentence letter, sentential variable, or sentential letter) is an input variable (that can either be true or false) of a truth function. Propositional variables are the basic building-blocks of propositional formulas, used in propositional logic and higher-order logics.

== Uses ==
Formulas in logic are typically built up recursively from some propositional variables, some number of logical connectives, and some logical quantifiers. Propositional variables are the atomic formulas of propositional logic, and are often denoted using capital roman letters such as $P$, $Q$ and $R$.

Example

In a given propositional logic, a formula can be defined as follows:

- Every propositional variable is a formula.
- Given a formula X, the negation ¬X is a formula.
- Given two formulas X and Y, and a binary connective b (such as the logical conjunction ∧), the expression (X b Y) is a formula. (Note the parentheses.)

Through this construction, all of the formulas of propositional logic can be built up from propositional variables as a basic unit. Propositional variables should not be confused with the metavariables, which appear in the typical axioms of propositional calculus; the latter effectively range over well-formed formulae, and are often denoted using lower-case greek letters such as $\alpha$, $\beta$ and $\gamma$.

== Predicate logic ==
Propositional variables with no object variables such as x and y attached to predicate letters such as Px and xRy, having instead individual constants a, b, ... attached to predicate letters are propositional constants Pa, aRb. These propositional constants are atomic propositions, not containing propositional operators.

The internal structure of propositional variables contains predicate letters such as P and Q, in association with bound individual variables (e.g., x, y), individual constants such as a and b (singular terms from a domain of discourse D), ultimately taking a form such as Pa, aRb.(or with parenthesis, $P(11)$ and $R(1, 3)$).

Propositional logic is sometimes called zeroth-order logic due to not considering the internal structure in contrast with first-order logic which analyzes the internal structure of the atomic sentences.

== See also ==
- Boolean algebra (logic)
- Boolean data type
- Boolean domain
- Boolean function
- Logical value
- Predicate variable

== Bibliography ==
- Smullyan, Raymond M. First-Order Logic. 1968. Dover edition, 1995. Chapter 1.1: Formulas of Propositional Logic.
