= James Fieser =

American philosopher

Philosophical work
- Era: Contemporary philosophy
- Region: American philosophy
- Main interests: Ethics; History of philosophy Philosophy of David Hume

James Fieser is an American philosopher and professor of philosophy at the University of Tennessee at Martin. He received his B.A. from Berea College, and his M.A. and Ph.D. in philosophy from Purdue University. He is founder and general editor of the Internet Encyclopedia of Philosophy. He is author, coauthor or editor of more than ten books.

== Works ==
- James Fieser, ed. (2000). Scottish Common Sense Philosophy.
- James Fieser (2000). Moral Philosophy through the Ages. James Fieser. ISBN 9780767412988.
- James Fieser; Norman Lillegard, eds. (2002). A Historical Introduction to Philosophy. Oxford University Press. ISBN 978-0195139846.
- James Fieser (2003). "A Bibliography of Hume's Writings and Early Responses" (PDF). Archived from the original (PDF) on August 5, 2013.
- James Fieser, ed. (2005). Early Responses to Hume. Thoemmes. ISBN 978-1843711186.
- Samuel Enoch Stumpf; James Fieser (2007). Socrates to Sartre and Beyond. McGraw Hill.
- James Fieser (2008). Great Issues in Philosophy". Selected chapters online.
- Louis P. Pojman; James Fieser (2010). Ethical Theory: Classical and Contemporary Readings (6th ed.). Cengage Learning. ISBN 978-0495808770.
- Louis P. Pojman; James Fieser (2011). Ethics: Discovering Right and Wrong. Cengage Learning. ISBN 978-1111298173.
