= Symbol (formal) =

Token in a mathematical or logical formula

This diagram shows the syntactic entities that may be constructed from formal languages. The symbols and strings of symbols may be broadly divided into nonsense and well-formed formulas. A formal language can be thought of as identical to the set of its well-formed formulas. The set of well-formed formulas may be broadly divided into theorems and non-theorems.

In mathematics, a symbol is a glyph or a group of glyphs that is used in mathematical notation. In mathematical logic, a symbol is, more specifically, an element of the alphabet used for writing formulas of a formal system.

== Overview ==
Symbols of a formal language need not be symbols of anything. For instance there are logical constants which do not refer to any idea, but rather serve as a form of punctuation in the language (e.g. parentheses). Symbols of a formal language must be capable of being specified without any reference to any interpretation of them.

A symbol or string of symbols may comprise a well-formed formula if it is consistent with the formation rules of the language.

In a formal system a symbol may be used as a token in formal operations. The set of formal symbols in a formal language is referred to as an alphabet (hence each symbol may be referred to as a "letter")

A formal symbol as used in first-order logic may be a variable (member from a universe of discourse), a constant, a function (mapping to another member of universe) or a predicate (mapping to T/F).

Formal symbols are usually thought of as purely syntactic structures, composed into larger structures using a formal grammar, though sometimes they may be associated with an interpretation or model (a formal semantics).

== Words modeled as formal symbols ==
The move to view units in natural language (e.g. English) as formal symbols was initiated by Noam Chomsky (it was this work that resulted in the Chomsky hierarchy in formal languages). The generative grammar model looked upon syntax as autonomous from semantics. Building on these models, the logician Richard Montague proposed that semantics could also be constructed on top of the formal structure:

There is in my opinion no important theoretical difference between natural languages and the artificial languages of logicians; indeed, I consider it possible to comprehend the syntax and semantics of both kinds of language within a single natural and mathematically precise theory. On this point I differ from a number of philosophers, but agree, I believe, with Chomsky and his associates."

This is the philosophical premise underlying Montague grammar.

However, this attempt to equate linguistic symbols with formal symbols has been challenged widely, particularly in the tradition of cognitive linguistics, by philosophers like Stevan Harnad, and linguists like George Lakoff and Ronald Langacker.

== See also ==
- List of mathematical symbols
- List of logic symbols
- Terminal and nonterminal symbols
