= Simple theorems in the algebra of sets =

Basic set identities like commutative and associative laws

The simple theorems in the algebra of sets are some of the elementary properties of the algebra of union (infix operator: ∪), intersection (infix operator: ∩), and set complement (postfix ') of sets.

These properties assume the existence of at least two sets: a given universal set, denoted U, and the empty set, denoted {}. The algebra of sets describes the properties of all possible subsets of U, called the power set of U and denoted P(U). P(U) is assumed closed under union, intersection, and set complement. The algebra of sets is an interpretation or model of Boolean algebra, with union, intersection, set complement, U, and {} interpreting Boolean sum, product, complement, 1, and 0, respectively.

The properties below are stated without proof, but can be derived from a small number of properties taken as axioms. A "*" follows the algebra of sets interpretation of Huntington's (1904) classic postulate set for Boolean algebra. These properties can be visualized with Venn diagrams. They also follow from the fact that P(U) is a Boolean lattice. The properties followed by "L" interpret the lattice axioms.

Elementary discrete mathematics courses sometimes leave students with the impression that the subject matter of set theory is no more than these properties. For more about elementary set theory, see set, set theory, algebra of sets, and naive set theory. For an introduction to set theory at a higher level, see also axiomatic set theory, cardinal number, ordinal number, Cantor–Bernstein–Schroeder theorem, Cantor's diagonal argument, Cantor's first uncountability proof, Cantor's theorem, well-ordering theorem, axiom of choice, and Zorn's lemma.

The properties below include a defined binary operation, relative complement, denoted by the infix operator "\". The "relative complement of A in B," denoted B \A, is defined as (A ∪B′)′ and as A′ ∩B.

PROPOSITION 1. For any U and any subset A of U:

- {}′ = U;
- 'U'′ = {};
- A \ {} = A;
- {} \ A = {};
- A ∩ {} = {};
- A ∪ {} = A; *
- A ∩ U = A; *
- A ∪ U = U;
- A′ ∪ A = U; *
- A′ ∩ A = {}; *
- A \ A = {};
- U \ A = A′;
- A \ U = {};
- A′′ = A;
- A ∩ A = A;
- A ∪ A = A.

PROPOSITION 2. For any sets A, B, and C:

- A ∩ B = B ∩ A; * L
- A ∪ B = B ∪ A; * L
- A ∪ (A ∩ B) = A; L
- A ∩ (A ∪ B) = A; L
- (A ∪ B) \ A = B \ A;
- A ∩ B = {} if and only if B \ A = B;
- (A′ ∪ B)′ ∪ (A′ ∪ B′)′ = A;
- (A ∩ B) ∩ C = A ∩ (B ∩ C); L
- (A ∪ B) ∪ C = A ∪ (B ∪ C); L
- C \ (A ∩ B) = (C \ A) ∪ (C \ B);
- C \ (A ∪ B) = (C \ A) ∩ (C \ B);
- C \ (B \ A) = (C \ B) ∪(C ∩ A);
- (B \ A) ∩ C = (B ∩ C) \ A = B ∩ (C \ A);
- (B \ A) ∪ C = (B ∪ C) \ (A \ C).

The distributive laws:

- A ∩ (B ∪ C) = (A ∩ B) ∪ (A ∩ C); *
- A ∪ (B ∩ C) = (A ∪ B) ∩ (A ∪ C). *

PROPOSITION 3. Some properties of ⊆:

- A ⊆ B if and only if A ∩ B = A;
- A ⊆ B if and only if A ∪ B = B;
- A ⊆ B if and only if B′ ⊆ A′;
- A ⊆ B if and only if A \ B = {};
- A ∩ B ⊆ A ⊆ A ∪ B.

== See also ==
- List of set identities and relations – Equalities for combinations of sets
