= Second-order predicate =

Aspect of mathematical logic

In mathematical logic, a second-order predicate is a predicate that takes a first-order predicate as an argument. Compare higher-order predicate.

The idea of second order predication was introduced by the German mathematician and philosopher Frege. It is based on his idea that a predicate such as "is a philosopher" designates a concept, rather than an object. Sometimes a concept can itself be the subject of a proposition, such as in "There are no Bosnian philosophers". In this case, we are not saying anything of any Bosnian philosophers, but of the concept "is a Bosnian philosopher" that it is not satisfied. Thus the predicate "is not satisfied" attributes something to the concept "is a Bosnian philosopher", and is thus a second-level predicate.

This idea is the basis of Frege's theory of number.
