= Polysyllogism =

Sequence of propositions which constitute a sequence of overlapping syllogisms

A polysyllogism is a complex argument (also known as chain arguments of which there are four kinds: polysyllogisms, sorites, epicheirema, and dilemmas) that strings together any number of propositions forming together a sequence of syllogisms such that the conclusion of each syllogism, together with the next proposition, is a premise for the next, and so on. Each constituent syllogism is called a prosyllogism except the last, because the conclusion of the last syllogism is not a premise for another syllogism.

== Example ==
An example of a categorical polysyllogism is:

1. All good students will readily understand polysyllogisms
2. All students of logic are good students
3. Therefore, all students of logic will readily understand polysyllogisms
4. But all people who read this web page are students of logic
5. Therefore, all people who read this web page will readily understand polysyllogisms

This argument has the following structure:

1. All A is B
2. All C is A
3. Therefore: all C is B
4. All D is C
5. Therefore, all D is B

Note two points: first, the makeup of a polysyllogism need not be limited to two component syllogisms. In fact, it can have any number of component syllogisms. Second, validity depends on all its parts. If any one is not valid then the whole polysyllogism is to be considered invalid.

An example for a propositional polysyllogism is:

1. It is raining.
2. If we go out while it is raining we will get wet.
3. If we get wet, we will get cold.
4. Therefore, if we go out we will get cold.

Examination of the structure of the argument reveals the following sequence of constituent (pro)syllogisms:

  1. It is raining.
  2. If we go out while it is raining we will get wet.
  3. Therefore, if we go out we will get wet.
  1. If we go out we will get wet.
  2. If we get wet, we will get cold.
  3. Therefore, if we go out we will get cold.

== Sorites ==
A sorites (plural: sorites) is a specific kind of polysyllogism in which the predicate of each proposition is the subject of the next premise. Example:

1. All lions are big cats.
2. All big cats are predators.
3. All predators are carnivores.
4. Therefore, all lions are carnivores.

The word sorites /sɒˈraɪtiːz/ comes from Ancient Greek: σωρίτης, heaped up, from σωρός heap or pile. Thus a sorites is a heap of propositions chained together. A sorites polysyllogism should not be confused with the sorites paradox, a.k.a. the fallacy of the heap.

Lewis Carroll uses sorites in his book Symbolic Logic (1896). For example:

1. No experienced person is incompetent;
2. Jenkins is always blundering;
3. No competent person is always blundering.
4. Jenkins is inexperienced.

Carroll's example may be translated thus:

1. All experienced persons are competent persons.
2. No competent persons are blunderers.
3. Jenkins is a blunderer.
4. Jenkins is not an experienced person.

== See also ==
- Anadiplosis - the rhetorical grounds of polysyllogism.
- Philosophical realism
- Transitive relation
- Type of syllogism (disjunctive, hypothetical, legal, poly-, prosleptic, quasi-, statistical)

== Bibliography ==
- B. P. Bairan. An Introduction to Syllogistic Logic. Goodwill Trading. p. 342. ISBN 971-574-094-4.
- M. Cothran. Traditional Logic II:Advanced Formal Logic. Memoria Press. p. 342. ISBN 978-1-61538-874-5.
- J. Maritain. Formal Logic. Sheed & Ward. p. 253. ASIN B0007F0HL0.
