= Atomic formula =

Mathematical logic concept

In mathematical logic, an atomic formula (also known as an atom or a prime formula) is a formula with no deeper propositional structure, that is, a formula that contains no logical connectives or equivalently a formula that has no strict subformulas. Atoms are thus the simplest well-formed formulas of the logic. Compound formulas are formed by combining the atomic formulas using the logical connectives.

The precise form of atomic formulas depends on the logic under consideration; for propositional logic, for example, a propositional variable is often more briefly referred to as an "atomic formula", but, more precisely, a propositional variable is not an atomic formula but a formal expression that denotes an atomic formula. For predicate logic, the atoms are predicate symbols together with their arguments, each argument being a term. In model theory, atomic formulas are merely strings of symbols with a given signature, which may or may not be satisfiable with respect to a given model.

== Atomic formula in first-order logic ==
The well-formed terms and propositions of ordinary first-order logic have the following syntax:

Terms:

- $t \equiv c \mid x \mid f (t_{1},\dotsc, t_{n})$,

that is, a term is recursively defined to be a constant c (a named object from the domain of discourse), or a variable x (ranging over the objects in the domain of discourse), or an n-ary function f whose arguments are terms t_{k}. Functions map tuples of objects to objects.

Propositions:

- $A, B, ... \equiv P (t_{1},\dotsc, t_{n}) \mid A \wedge B \mid \top \mid A \vee B \mid \bot \mid A \supset B \mid \forall x.\ A \mid \exists x.\ A$,

that is, a proposition is recursively defined to be an n-ary predicate P whose arguments are terms t_{k}, or an expression composed of logical connectives (and, or) and quantifiers (for-all, there-exists) used with other propositions.

An atomic formula or atom is simply a predicate applied to a tuple of terms; that is, an atomic formula is a formula of the form P (t_{1} ,…, t_{n}) for P a predicate, and the t_{n} terms.

All other well-formed formulas are obtained by composing atoms with logical connectives and quantifiers.

For example, the formula ∀x. P (x) ∧ ∃y. Q (y, f (x)) ∨ ∃z. R (z) contains the atoms

- $P (x)$
- $Q (y, f (x))$
- $R (z)$.

As there are no quantifiers appearing in an atomic formula, all occurrences of variable symbols in an atomic formula are free.

== See also ==
- In model theory, structures assign an interpretation to the atomic formulas.
- In proof theory, polarity assignment for atomic formulas is an essential component of focusing.
- Atomic sentence
