= Formation rule =

Rule defining the correct structure of expressions in formal grammar

In mathematical logic, formation rules are rules for describing well-formed words over the alphabet of a formal language. These rules only address the location and manipulation of the strings of the language. It does not describe anything else about a language, such as its semantics (i.e. what the strings mean). (See also formal grammar).

== Formal language ==
A formal language is an organized set of symbols the essential feature being that it can be precisely defined in terms of just the shapes and locations of those symbols. Such a language can be defined, then, without any reference to any meanings of any of its expressions; it can exist before any interpretation is assigned to it—that is, before it has any meaning. A formal grammar determines which symbols and sets of symbols are formulas in a formal language.

== Formal systems ==
A formal system (also called a logical calculus, or a logical system) consists of a formal language together with a deductive apparatus (also called a deductive system). The deductive apparatus may consist of a set of transformation rules (also called inference rules) or a set of axioms, or have both. A formal system is used to derive one expression from one or more other expressions. Propositional and predicate calculi are examples of formal systems.

== Propositional and predicate logic ==
The formation rules of a propositional calculus may, for instance, take a form such that;

- if we take Φ to be a propositional formula we can also take $\neg$Φ to be a formula;
- if we take Φ and Ψ to be a propositional formulas we can also take (Φ $\wedge$ Ψ), (Φ $\to$ Ψ), (Φ $\lor$ Ψ) and (Φ $\leftrightarrow$ Ψ) to also be formulas.

A predicate calculus will usually include all the same rules as a propositional calculus, with the addition of quantifiers such that if we take Φ to be a formula of propositional logic and α as a variable then we can take ($\forall$α)Φ and ($\exists$α)Φ each to be formulas of our predicate calculus.

== See also ==
- finite-state automaton
