= Formal system =

Mathematical model for deduction or proof systems

A formal system (or deductive system) is an abstract structure and formalization of an axiomatic system used for deducing, using rules of inference, theorems from axioms.

In 1921, David Hilbert proposed to use formal systems as the foundation of knowledge in mathematics. However, in 1931 Kurt Gödel proved that any consistent formal system sufficiently powerful to express basic arithmetic cannot prove its own completeness. This effectively showed that Hilbert's program was impossible as stated.

The term formalism is sometimes a rough synonym for formal system, but it also refers to a given style of notation, for example, Paul Dirac's bra–ket notation.

== Concepts ==
This diagram shows the syntactic entities that may be constructed from formal languages. The symbols and strings of symbols may be broadly divided into nonsense and well-formed formulas. A formal language can be thought of as identical to the set of its well-formed formulas, which may be broadly divided into theorems and non-theorems.

A formal system has the following components, as a minimum:

- Formal language, which is a set of well-formed formulas, which are strings of symbols from an alphabet, formed by a formal grammar (consisting of production rules or formation rules).
- Deductive system, deductive apparatus, or proof system, which has rules of inference that take axioms and infers theorems, both of which are part of the formal language.
- In some cases an inductive system, used to derive a proof by first establishing a simple case, then generalizing it.

A formal system is said to be recursive (i.e. effective) or recursively enumerable if the set of axioms and the set of inference rules are decidable sets or semidecidable sets, respectively.

=== Formal language ===
A formal language is a language that uses a set of strings whose symbols are taken from a specific alphabet, and operations used to form sentences from them. Like languages in linguistics, formal languages generally have two aspects:

- the syntax is what the language looks like (more formally: the set of possible expressions that are valid utterances in the language)
- the semantics are what the utterances of the language mean (which is formalized in various ways, depending on the type of language in question)

Usually only the syntax of a formal language is considered via the notion of a formal grammar. The two main categories of formal grammar are that of generative grammars, which are sets of rules for how strings in a language can be written, and that of analytic grammars (or reductive grammar), which are sets of rules for how a string can be analyzed to determine whether it is a member of the language.

=== Deductive system ===
A deductive system, also called a deductive apparatus, consists of the axioms (or axiom schemata) and rules of inference that can be used to derive theorems of the system.

In order to sustain its deductive integrity, a deductive apparatus must be definable without reference to any intended interpretation of the language. The aim is to ensure that each line of a derivation is merely a logical consequence of the lines that precede it. There should be no element of any interpretation of the language that gets involved with the deductive nature of the system.

The logical consequence (or entailment) of the system by its logical foundation is what distinguishes a formal system from others which may have some basis in an abstract model. Often the formal system will be the basis for or even identified with a larger theory or field (e.g. Euclidean geometry) consistent with the usage in modern mathematics such as model theory.

An example of a deductive system would be the rules of inference and axioms regarding equality used in first order logic.

The two main types of deductive systems are proof systems and formal semantics.

==== Proof system ====
Formal proofs are sequences of well-formed formulas (or WFF for short) that might either be an axiom or be the product of applying an inference rule on previous WFFs in the proof sequence.

Once a formal system is given, one can define the set of theorems which can be proved inside the formal system. This set consists of all WFFs for which there is a proof. Thus all axioms are considered theorems. Unlike the grammar for WFFs, there is no guarantee that there will be a decision procedure for deciding whether a given WFF is a theorem or not.

The point of view that generating formal proofs is all there is to mathematics is often called formalism. David Hilbert founded metamathematics as a discipline for discussing formal systems. Any language that one uses to talk about a formal system is called a metalanguage. The metalanguage may be a natural language, or it may be partially formalized itself, but it is generally less completely formalized than the formal language component of the formal system under examination, which is then called the object language, that is, the object of the discussion in question. The notion of theorem just defined should not be confused with theorems about the formal system, which, in order to avoid confusion, are usually called metatheorems.

==== Formal semantics of logical system ====
A logical system is a deductive system (most commonly first order logic) together with additional non-logical axioms. According to model theory, a logical system may be given interpretations which describe whether a given structure - the mapping of formulas to a particular meaning - satisfies a well-formed formula. A structure that satisfies all the axioms of the formal system is known as a model of the logical system.

A logical system is:

- Sound, if each well-formed formula that can be inferred from the axioms is satisfied by every model of the logical system.
- Semantically complete, if each well-formed formula that is satisfied by every model of the logical system can be inferred from the axioms.

An example of a logical system is Peano arithmetic. The standard model of arithmetic sets the domain of discourse to be the nonnegative integers and gives the symbols their usual meaning. There are also non-standard models of arithmetic.

== History ==
Early logic systems includes Indian logic of Pāṇini, syllogistic logic of Aristotle, propositional logic of Stoicism, and Chinese logic of Gongsun Long (c. 325–250 BCE). In more recent times, contributors include George Boole, Augustus De Morgan, and Gottlob Frege. Mathematical logic was developed in 19th century Europe.

David Hilbert instigated a formalist movement called Hilbert's program as a proposed solution to the foundational crisis of mathematics, that was eventually tempered by Gödel's incompleteness theorems. The QED manifesto represented a subsequent, as yet unsuccessful, effort at formalization of known mathematics.

== See also ==
- List of formal systems
- Formal method – Mathematical program specifications
- Formal science – Study of abstract structures described by formal systems
- Logic translation – Translation of a text into a logical system
- Rewriting system – Replacing subterm in a formula with another term
- Substitution instance – Concept in logic
- Theory (mathematical logic) – Set of sentences in a formal language

== Sources ==
- Hunter, Geoffrey (1996) [1971]. Metalogic: An Introduction to the Metatheory of Standard First-Order Logic. University of California Press (published 1973). ISBN 9780520023567. OCLC 36312727. (accessible to patrons with print disabilities).
