= Well-formed formula =

Syntactically correct logical formula

In mathematical logic, propositional logic, and predicate logic, a well-formed formula, abbreviated WFF or wff, often simply formula, is a finite sequence of symbols from a given alphabet, constructed following the defined grammar of a formal language.

The abbreviation wff is pronounced "woof", or sometimes "wiff", "weff", or "whiff". (Note: "woof"; "wiff"; "weff"; "whiff"; All sources supported "woof". The sources cited for "wiff", "weff", and "whiff" gave these pronunciations as alternatives to "woof". The Gensler source gives "wood" and "woofer" as examples of how to pronounce the vowel in "woof".)

A formal language can be identified with the set of formulas in the language. A formula is a syntactic object that can be given a semantic meaning by means of an interpretation. Two key uses of formulas are in propositional logic and predicate logic.

== Introduction ==
A key use of formulas is in propositional logic and predicate logic such as first-order logic. In those contexts, a formula is a string of symbols φ for which it makes sense to ask "is φ true?", once any free variables in φ have been instantiated. In formal logic, proofs can be represented by sequences of formulas with certain properties, and the final formula in the sequence is what is proven.

Although the term "formula" may be used for written marks (for instance, on a piece of paper or chalkboard), it is more precisely understood as the sequence of symbols being expressed, with the marks being a token instance of formula. This distinction between the vague notion of "property" and the inductively defined notion of well-formed formula has roots in Weyl's 1910 paper "Über die Definitionen der mathematischen Grundbegriffe". Thus the same formula may be written more than once, and a formula might in principle be so long that it cannot be written at all within the physical universe.

Formulas themselves are syntactic objects. They are given meanings by interpretations. For example, in a propositional formula, each propositional variable may be interpreted as a concrete proposition, so that the overall formula expresses a relationship between these propositions. A formula need not be interpreted, however, to be considered solely as a formula.

== Propositional calculus ==
The formulas of propositional calculus, also called propositional formulas, are expressions such as $(A \land (B \lor C))$. Their definition begins with the arbitrary choice of a set V of propositional variables. The alphabet consists of the letters in V along with the symbols for the propositional connectives and parentheses "(" and ")", all of which are assumed to not be in V. The formulas will be certain expressions (that is, strings of symbols) over this alphabet.

The formulas are inductively defined as follows:

- Each propositional variable is, on its own, a formula.
- If φ is a formula, then ¬φ is a formula.
- If φ and ψ are formulas, and • is any binary connective, then ( φ • ψ) is a formula. Here • could be (but is not limited to) the usual operators ∨, ∧, →, or ↔.

This definition can also be written as a formal grammar in Backus–Naur form, provided the set of variables is finite:

<alpha set> ::= p | q | r | s | t | u | ... (the arbitrary finite set of propositional variables)
<form> ::= <alpha set> | ¬<form> | (<form>∧<form>) | (<form>∨<form>) | (<form>→<form>) | (<form>↔<form>)

Using this grammar, the sequence of symbols

(((p → q) ∧ (r → s)) ∨ (¬q ∧ ¬s))

is a formula, because it is grammatically correct. The sequence of symbols

((p → q)→(qq))p))

is not a formula, because it does not conform to the grammar.

A complex formula may be difficult to read, owing to, for example, the proliferation of parentheses. To alleviate this last phenomenon, precedence rules (akin to the standard mathematical order of operations) are assumed among the operators, making some operators more binding than others. For example, assuming the precedence (from most binding to least binding) 1. ¬ 2. → 3. ∧ 4. ∨. Then the formula

(((p → q) ∧ (r → s)) ∨ (¬q ∧ ¬s))

may be abbreviated as

p → q ∧ r → s ∨ ¬q ∧ ¬s

This is, however, only a convention used to simplify the written representation of a formula. If the precedence was assumed, for example, to be left-right associative, in following order: 1. ¬ 2. ∧ 3. ∨ 4. →, then the same formula above (without parentheses) would be rewritten as

(p → (q ∧ r)) → (s ∨ (¬q ∧ ¬s))

== Predicate logic ==
The definition of a formula in first-order logic $\mathcal{QS}$ is relative to the signature of the theory at hand. This signature specifies the constant symbols, predicate symbols, and function symbols of the theory at hand, along with the arities of the function and predicate symbols.

The definition of a formula comes in several parts. First, the set of terms is defined recursively. Terms, informally, are expressions that represent objects from the domain of discourse.

1. Any variable is a term.
2. Any constant symbol from the signature is a term
3. an expression of the form f(t_{1},...,t_{n}), where f is an n-ary function symbol, and t_{1},...,t_{n} are terms, is again a term.

The next step is to define the atomic formulas.

1. If t_{1} and t_{2} are terms then t_{1}=t_{2} is an atomic formula
2. If R is an n-ary predicate symbol, and t_{1},...,t_{n} are terms, then R(t_{1},...,t_{n}) is an atomic formula

Finally, the set of formulas is defined to be the smallest set containing the set of atomic formulas such that the following holds:

1. $\neg\phi$ is a formula when $\phi$ is a formula
2. $(\phi \land \psi)$ and $(\phi \lor \psi)$ are formulas when $\phi$ and $\psi$ are formulas;
3. $\exists x\, \phi$ is a formula when $x$ is a variable and $\phi$ is a formula;
4. $\forall x\, \phi$ is a formula when $x$ is a variable and $\phi$ is a formula (alternatively, $\forall x\, \phi$ could be defined as an abbreviation for $\neg\exists x\, \neg\phi$).

If a formula has no occurrences of $\exists x$ or $\forall x$, for any variable $x$, then it is called quantifier-free. An existential formula is a formula starting with a sequence of existential quantification followed by a quantifier-free formula.

The definition above has the property known as unique readability: if a formula is not atomic, then exactly one of the formation clauses was the last clause applied to construct it, so that each formula is produced from the atomic formulas in exactly one way and has a single main connective or initial quantifier. This ensures that the definition of satisfaction of a formula in an interpretation, which proceeds clause by clause, is coherent: at each stage of breaking down a formula, exactly one clause applies.

== Atomic and open formulas ==
An atomic formula is a formula that contains no logical connectives nor quantifiers, or equivalently a formula that has no strict subformulas. The precise form of atomic formulas depends on the formal system under consideration; for propositional logic, for example, the atomic formulas are the propositional variables. For predicate logic, the atoms are predicate symbols together with their arguments, each argument being a term.

According to some terminology, an open formula is formed by combining atomic formulas using only logical connectives, to the exclusion of quantifiers. This is not to be confused with a formula which is not closed.

== Closed formulas ==
A closed formula, also ground formula or sentence, is a formula in which there are no free occurrences of any variable. If A is a formula of a first-order language in which the variables v_{1}, …, v_{n} have free occurrences, then A preceded by ∀v_{1} ⋯ ∀v_{n} is a universal closure of A.

== Properties applicable to formulas ==
- A formula A in a language $\mathcal{Q}$ is valid if it is true for every interpretation of $\mathcal{Q}$.
- A formula A in a language $\mathcal{Q}$ is satisfiable if it is true for some interpretation of $\mathcal{Q}$.
- A formula A of the language of arithmetic is decidable if it represents a decidable set, i.e. if there is an effective method which, given a substitution of the free variables of A, says that either the resulting instance of A is provable or its negation is.

== Usage of the terminology ==
In earlier works on mathematical logic (e.g. by Church), formulas referred to any strings of symbols and among these strings, well-formed formulas were the strings that followed the formation rules of (correct) formulas.

Several authors simply say formula. Modern usages (especially in the context of computer science with mathematical software such as model checkers, automated theorem provers, interactive theorem provers) tend to retain of the notion of formula only the algebraic concept and to leave the question of well-formedness, i.e. of the concrete string representation of formulas (using this or that symbol for connectives and quantifiers, using this or that parenthesizing convention, using Polish or infix notation, etc.) as a mere notational problem.

The expression "well-formed formulas" (WFF) also crept into popular culture. WFF is part of an esoteric pun used in the name of the academic game "WFF 'N PROOF: The Game of Modern Logic", by Layman Allen, developed while he was at Yale Law School (he was later a professor at the University of Michigan). The suite of games is designed to teach the principles of symbolic logic to children (in Polish notation). Its name is an echo of whiffenpoof, a nonsense word used as a cheer at Yale University made popular in The Whiffenpoof Song and The Whiffenpoofs.

== See also ==
- Ground expression
- Well-defined expression
- Formal language
- Glossary of logic
- WFF 'N Proof
