= Function symbol =

Symbol representing a mathematical concept

In formal systems, and particularly mathematical logic, a function symbol is a non-logical symbol which represents a function or mapping on the domain of discourse, though, formally, does not need to represent anything at all. Function symbols are a basic component in formal languages to form terms. Specifically, if the symbol $F$ is a function symbol, then given any constant symbol $X$ representing an object in the language, $F(X)$ also represents an object in the language. Similarly, if $T$ is some term in the language, $F(T)$ is also a term. As such, the interpretation of a function symbol must be defined over the whole domain of discourse. Function symbols are a primitive notion, and are therefore not defined in terms of other, more basic concepts.

In typed logic, F is a functional symbol with domain type T and codomain type U if, given any symbol X representing an object of type T, F(X) is a symbol representing an object of type U. One can similarly define function symbols of more than one variable, analogous to functions of more than one variable; a function symbol in zero variables is simply a constant symbol.

Now consider a model of the formal language, with the types T and U modelled by sets [T] and [U] and each symbol X of type T modelled by an element [X] in [T]. Then F can be modelled by the set

$$[F]:=\big\{([X],[F(X)]):[X]\in[\mathbf{T}]\big\},$$

which is simply a function with domain [T] and codomain [U]. It is a requirement of a consistent model that [F(X)] = [F(Y)] whenever [X] = [Y].

== Introducing new function symbols ==
In a treatment of predicate logic that allows one to introduce new predicate symbols, one will also want to be able to introduce new function symbols. Given the function symbols F and G, one can introduce a new function symbol F ∘ G, the composition of F and G, satisfying (F ∘ G)(X) = F(G(X)), for all X. Of course, the right side of this equation doesn't make sense in typed logic unless the domain type of F matches the codomain type of G, so this is required for the composition to be defined.

One also gets certain function symbols automatically. In untyped logic, there is an identity predicate id that satisfies id(X) = X for all X. In typed logic, given any type T, there is an identity predicate id_{T} with domain and codomain type T; it satisfies id_{T}(X) = X for all X of type T. Similarly, if T is a subtype of U, then there is an inclusion predicate of domain type T and codomain type U that satisfies the same equation; there are additional function symbols associated with other ways of constructing new types out of old ones.

Additionally, one can define functional predicates after proving an appropriate theorem. (If you're working in a formal system that doesn't allow you to introduce new symbols after proving theorems, then you will have to use relation symbols to get around this, as in the next section.) Specifically, if you can prove that for every X (or every X of a certain type), there exists a unique Y satisfying some condition P, then you can introduce a function symbol F to indicate this. This is called an extension by definition. Note that P will itself be a relational predicate involving both X and Y. So if there is such a predicate P and a theorem:

For all X of type T, for some unique Y of type U, P(X,Y),

then you can introduce a function symbol F of domain type T and codomain type U that satisfies:

For all X of type T, for all Y of type U, P(X,Y) if and only if Y = F(X).

== Doing without functional predicates ==
Many treatments of predicate logic don't allow functional predicates, only relational predicates. This is useful, for example, in the context of proving metalogical theorems (such as Gödel's incompleteness theorems), where one doesn't want to allow the introduction of new functional symbols (nor any other new symbols, for that matter). But there is a method of replacing functional symbols with relational symbols wherever the former may occur; furthermore, this is algorithmic and thus suitable for applying most metalogical theorems to the result.

Specifically, if F has domain type T and codomain type U, then it can be replaced with a predicate P of type (T,U). Intuitively, P(X,Y) means F(X) = Y. Then whenever F(X) would appear in a statement, you can replace it with a new symbol Y of type U and include another statement P(X,Y). To be able to make the same deductions, you need an additional proposition:

For all X of type T, for some unique Y of type U, P(X,Y).

(Of course, this is the same proposition that had to be proven as a theorem before introducing a new function symbol in the previous section.)

Because the elimination of functional predicates is both convenient for some purposes and possible, many treatments of formal logic do not deal explicitly with function symbols but instead use only relation symbols; another way to think of this is that a functional predicate is a special kind of predicate, specifically one that satisfies the proposition above. This may seem to be a problem if you wish to specify a proposition schema that applies only to functional predicates F; how do you know ahead of time whether it satisfies that condition? To get an equivalent formulation of the schema, first replace anything of the form F(X) with a new variable Y. Then universally quantify over each Y immediately after the corresponding X is introduced (that is, after X is quantified over, or at the beginning of the statement if X is free), and guard the quantification with P(X,Y). Finally, make the entire statement a material consequence of the uniqueness condition for a functional predicate above.

Let us take as an example the axiom schema of replacement in Zermelo–Fraenkel set theory. (This example uses mathematical symbols.) This schema states (in one form), for any functional predicate F in one variable:

$$\forall A, \exists B, \forall C, C \in A \rightarrow F(C)\in B.$$

First, we must replace F(C) with some other variable D:

$$\forall A, \exists B, \forall C, C \in A\rightarrow D \in B.$$

Of course, this statement isn't correct; D must be quantified over just after C:

$$\forall A, \exists B, \forall C, \forall D, C \in A \rightarrow D\in B.$$

We still must introduce P to guard this quantification:

$$\forall A, \exists B, \forall C, \forall D, P(C,D) \rightarrow (C \in A \rightarrow D \in B).$$

This is almost correct, but it applies to too many predicates; what we actually want is:

$$(\forall X, \exists ! Y, P(X,Y))\rightarrow (\forall A, \exists B, \forall C, \forall D, P(C,D)\rightarrow (C \in A \rightarrow D \in B)).$$

This version of the axiom schema of replacement is now suitable for use in a formal language that doesn't allow the introduction of new function symbols. Alternatively, one may interpret the original statement as a statement in such a formal language; it was merely an abbreviation for the statement produced at the end.

== Uninterpreted functions ==
An uninterpreted function is one that has no other property than its name and n-ary form. The theory of uninterpreted functions is also sometimes called the free theory, because it is freely generated, and thus a free object, or the empty theory, being the theory having an empty set of sentences (in analogy to an initial algebra). Theories with a non-empty set of equations are known as equational theories. The satisfiability problem for free theories is solved by syntactic unification; algorithms for the latter are used by interpreters for various computer languages, such as Prolog. Syntactic unification is also used in algorithms for the satisfiability problem for certain other equational theories, see Unification (computer science).

=== Example ===
As an example of uninterpreted functions for SMT-LIB, if this input is given to an SMT solver:

(declare-fun f (Int) Int)
(assert (= (f 10) 1))

the SMT solver would return "This input is satisfiable". That happens because f is an uninterpreted function (i.e., all that is known about f is its signature), so it is possible that f(10) = 1. But by applying the input below:

(declare-fun f (Int) Int)
(assert (= (f 10) 1))
(assert (= (f 10) 42))

the SMT solver would return "This input is unsatisfiable". That happens because f, being a function, can never return different values for the same input.

=== Discussion ===
The decision problem for free theories is particularly important, because many theories can be reduced by it.

Free theories can be solved by searching for common subexpressions to form the congruence closure. Solvers include satisfiability modulo theories solvers.

== See also ==
- Algebraic data type
- Initial algebra
- Logical connective
- Logical constant
- Term algebra
- Theory of pure equality
