= Elementary class =

Class in model theory

In model theory, a branch of mathematical logic, an elementary class (or axiomatizable class) is a class consisting of all structures satisfying a fixed first-order theory.

== Definition ==
A class K of structures of a signature σ is called an elementary class if there is a first-order theory T of signature σ, such that K consists of all models of T, i.e., of all σ-structures that satisfy T. If T can be chosen as a theory consisting of a single first-order sentence, then K is called a basic elementary class.

More generally, K is a pseudo-elementary class if there is a first-order theory T of a signature that extends σ, such that K consists of all σ-structures that are reducts to σ of models of T. In other words, a class K of σ-structures is pseudo-elementary if and only if there is an elementary class K' such that K consists of precisely the reducts to σ of the structures in K'.

For obvious reasons, elementary classes are also called axiomatizable in first-order logic, and basic elementary classes are called finitely axiomatizable in first-order logic. These definitions extend to other logics in the obvious way, but since the first-order case is by far the most important, axiomatizable implicitly refers to this case when no other logic is specified.

== Conflicting and alternative terminology ==
While the above is nowadays standard terminology in "infinite" model theory, the slightly different earlier definitions are still in use in finite model theory, where an elementary class may be called a Δ-elementary class, and the terms elementary class and first-order axiomatizable class are reserved for basic elementary classes (Ebbinghaus et al. 1994, Ebbinghaus and Flum 2005). Hodges calls elementary classes axiomatizable classes, and he refers to basic elementary classes as definable classes. He also uses the respective synonyms EC$_\Delta$ class and EC class (Hodges, 1993).

There are good reasons for this diverging terminology. The signatures that are considered in general model theory are often infinite, while a single first-order sentence contains only finitely many symbols. Therefore, basic elementary classes are atypical in infinite model theory. Finite model theory, on the other hand, deals almost exclusively with finite signatures. It is easy to see that for every finite signature σ and for every class K of σ-structures closed under isomorphism there is an elementary class $K'$ of σ-structures such that K and $K'$ contain precisely the same finite structures. Hence, elementary classes are not very interesting for finite model theorists.

== Easy relations between the notions ==
Clearly every basic elementary class is an elementary class, and every elementary class is a pseudo-elementary class. Moreover, as an easy consequence of the compactness theorem, a class of σ-structures is basic elementary if and only if it is elementary and its complement is also elementary.

== Examples ==
=== A basic elementary class ===
Let σ be a signature consisting only of a unary function symbol f. The class K of σ-structures in which f is one-to-one is a basic elementary class. This is witnessed by the theory T, which consists only of the single sentence

$$\forall x\forall y( (f(x)=f(y)) \to (x=y) )$$.

=== An elementary, basic pseudoelementary class that is not basic elementary ===
Let σ be an arbitrary signature. The class K of all infinite σ-structures is elementary. To see this, consider the sentences

$\rho_2={}$ "$\exist x_1\exist x_2(x_1 \not =x_2)$",

$\rho_3={}$ "$\exist x_1\exist x_2\exist x_3((x_1 \not =x_2) \land (x_1 \not =x_3) \land (x_2 \not =x_3))$",

and so on. (So the sentence $\rho_n$ says that there are at least n elements.) The infinite σ-structures are precisely the models of the theory

$$T_\infty=\{\rho_2, \rho_3, \rho_4, \dots\}$$.

But K is not a basic elementary class. Otherwise the infinite σ-structures would be precisely those that satisfy a certain first-order sentence τ. But then the set $\{\neg\tau, \rho_2, \rho_3, \rho_4, \dots\}$ would be inconsistent. By the compactness theorem, for some natural number n the set $\{\neg\tau, \rho_2, \rho_3, \rho_4, \dots, \rho_n\}$ would be inconsistent. But this is absurd, because this theory is satisfied by any finite σ-structure with $n+1$ or more elements.

However, there is a basic elementary class K' in the signature σ' = σ $\cup$ {f}, where f is a unary function symbol, such that K consists exactly of the reducts to σ of σ'-structures in K'. K' is axiomatised by the single sentence $(\forall x\forall y(f(x) = f(y) \rightarrow x=y) \land \exists y\neg\exists x(y = f(x))),$, which expresses that f is injective but not surjective. Therefore, K is elementary and what could be called basic pseudo-elementary, but not basic elementary.

=== Pseudo-elementary class that is non-elementary ===
Finally, consider the signature σ consisting of a single unary relation symbol P. Every σ-structure is partitioned into two subsets: Those elements for which P holds, and the rest. Let K be the class of all σ-structures for which these two subsets have the same cardinality, i.e., there is a bijection between them. This class is not elementary, because a σ-structure in which both the set of realisations of P and its complement are countably infinite satisfies precisely the same first-order sentences as a σ-structure in which one of the sets is countably infinite and the other is uncountable.

Now consider the signature $\sigma'$, which consists of P along with a unary function symbol f. Let $K'$ be the class of all $\sigma'$-structures such that f is a bijection and P holds for x iff P does not hold for f(x). $K'$ is clearly an elementary class, and therefore K is an example of a pseudo-elementary class that is not elementary.

=== Non-pseudo-elementary class ===
Let σ be an arbitrary signature. The class K of all finite σ-structures is not elementary, because (as shown above) its complement is elementary but not basic elementary. Since this is also true for every signature extending σ, K is not even a pseudo-elementary class.

This example demonstrates the limits of expressive power inherent in first-order logic as opposed to the far more expressive second-order logic. Second-order logic, however, fails to retain many desirable properties of first-order logic, such as the completeness and compactness theorems.
