= Philosophy of logic =

Study of the scope and nature of logic

Philosophy of logic is the branch of philosophy that studies the scope and nature of logic. It investigates the philosophical problems raised by logic, such as the presuppositions often implicitly at work in theories of logic and in their application. This involves questions about how logic is to be defined and how different logical systems are connected to each other. It includes the study of the nature of the fundamental concepts used by logic and the relation of logic to other disciplines. According to a common characterisation, philosophical logic is the part of the philosophy of logic that studies the application of logical methods to philosophical problems, often in the form of extended logical systems like modal logic. But other theorists draw the distinction between the philosophy of logic and philosophical logic differently or not at all. Metalogic is closely related to the philosophy of logic as the discipline investigating the properties of formal logical systems, like consistency and completeness.

Various characterizations of the nature of logic are found in the academic literature. Logic is often seen as the study of correct reasoning, valid inference, or logical consequence. It is a formal science that investigates how conclusions follow from premises in a topic-neutral manner, i.e. independent of the specific subject matter discussed. One form of inquiring into the nature of logic focuses on the commonalities between various logical formal systems and on how they differ from non-logical formal systems. Important considerations in this respect are whether the formal system in question is compatible with fundamental logical intuitions and whether it is complete. Different conceptions of logic can be distinguished according to whether they define logic as the study of valid inference or logical truth. A further distinction among conceptions of logic is based on whether the criteria of valid inference and logical truth are specified in terms of syntax or semantics.

Different types of logic are often distinguished. Logic is usually understood as formal logic and is treated as such for most of this article. Formal logic is only interested in the form of arguments, expressed in a formal language, and focuses on deductive inferences. Informal logic, on the other hand, addresses a much wider range of arguments found also in natural language, which include non-deductive arguments. The correctness of arguments may depend on other factors than their form, like their content or their context. Various logical formal systems or logics have been developed in the 20th century and it is the task of the philosophy of logic to classify them, to show how they are related to each other, and to address the problem of how there can be a manifold of logics in contrast to one universally true logic. These logics can be divided into classical logic, usually identified with first-order logic, extended logics, and deviant logics. Extended logics accept the basic formalism and the axioms of classical logic but extend them with new logical vocabulary. Deviant logics, on the other hand, reject certain core assumptions of classical logic and are therefore incompatible with it.

The philosophy of logic also investigates the nature and philosophical implications of the fundamental concepts of logic. This includes the problem of truth, especially of logical truth, which may be defined as truth depending only on the meanings of the logical terms used. Another question concerns the nature of premises and conclusions, i.e. whether to understand them as thoughts, propositions, or sentences, and how they are composed of simpler constituents. Together, premises and a conclusion constitute an inference, which can be either deductive and ampliative depending on whether it is necessarily truth-preserving or introduces new and possibly false information. A central concern in logic is whether a deductive inference is valid. Validity is often defined in terms of necessity, i.e. an inference is valid if and only if it is impossible for the premises to be true and the conclusion to be false. Incorrect inferences and arguments, on the other hand, fail to support their conclusion. They can be categorized as formal or informal fallacies depending on whether they belong to formal or informal logic. Logic has mostly been concerned with definitory rules, i.e. with the question of which rules of inference determine whether an argument is valid. A separate topic of inquiry concerns the strategic rules of logic: the rules governing how to reach an intended conclusion given a certain set of premises, i.e. which inferences need to be drawn to arrive there.

The metaphysics of logic is concerned with the metaphysical status of the laws and objects of logic. An important dispute in this field is between realists, who hold that logic is based on facts that have mind-independent existence, and anti-realists like conventionalists, who hold that the laws of logic are based on the conventions governing the use of language. Logic is closely related to various disciplines. A central issue in regard to ontology concerns the ontological commitments associated with the use of logic, for example, with singular terms and existential quantifiers. An important question in mathematics is whether all mathematical truths can be grounded in the axioms of logic together with set theory. Other related fields include computer science and psychology.

== Definition and related disciplines ==
Philosophy of logic is the area of philosophy that studies the nature of logic. Like many other disciplines, logic involves various philosophical presuppositions which are addressed by the philosophy of logic. The philosophy of logic can be understood in analogy to other discipline-specific branches of philosophy: just like the philosophy of science investigates philosophical problems raised by science, so the philosophy of logic investigates philosophical problems raised by logic.

An important question studied by the philosophy of logic is how logic is to be defined, for example, in terms of valid inference or of logical truth. This includes the issue of how to distinguish logical from non-logical formal systems. It is especially relevant for clarifying the relation between the various proposed logical systems, both classical and non-classical, and for evaluating whether all of these systems actually qualify as logical systems. The philosophy of logic also investigates how to understand the most fundamental concepts of logic, like truth, premises, conclusions, inference, argument, and validity. It tries to clarify the relation between logic and other fields, such as ontology, mathematics, and psychology.

The philosophy of logic is closely related to philosophical logic but there is no general agreement about how these disciplines stand to each other. Some theorists use these two terms for the same discipline while others see them as distinct disciplines. According to the latter view, philosophical logic contrasts with the philosophy of logic in that it is usually seen as the application of logical methods to philosophical problems, often by developing deviant or extended logics. In this sense, philosophical logic is one area of inquiry within the philosophy of logic, i.e. a part of the general study of philosophical problems raised by logic. But this form of distinction is not universally accepted and some authors have proposed different characterizations. The intimate connection between logic and philosophy is also reflected in the fact that many famous logicians were also philosophers. The philosophy of logic is closely related to metalogic but not identical to it. Metalogic investigates the properties of formal logical systems, like whether a given logical system is consistent or complete. It usually includes the study of the semantics and syntax of formal languages and formal systems.

== Nature of logic ==
The term "logic" is based on the Greek word "logos", which is associated with various different senses, such as reason, discourse, or language. There are many disagreements about what logic is and how it should be defined. Various characteristics are generally ascribed to logic, like that it studies the relation between premises and conclusions and that it does so in a topic-neutral manner. An important task of the philosophy of logic is to investigate the criteria according to which a formal system should count as logic. Different conceptions of logic understand it as either based on valid inference or logical truth. The criteria of valid inference and logical truth can themselves be specified in different ways: based on syntactic or semantic considerations.

=== General characteristics ===
Traditionally, logic is often understood as the discipline investigating laws of thought. One problem for this characterization is that logic is not an empirical discipline studying the regularities found in actual human thinking: this subject belongs to psychology. This is better captured by another characterization sometimes found in the literature: that logic concerns the laws of correct thinking or, more specifically, correct reasoning. This reflects the practical significance of logic as a tool to improve one's reasoning by drawing good inferences and becoming aware of possible mistakes. Logic has also been defined as the science of valid argumentation. This mirrors the definition in terms of reasoning since argumentation may be understood as an outward expression of inward reasoning.

Logic is often seen as a formal foundation of all knowledge. As a formal science, it stands in contrast to the material or empirical sciences, like physics or biology, since it is mainly concerned with entailment relations between propositions but not with whether these propositions actually are true. For example, deducing from the proposition "all moons are made of cheese" that "Earth's moon is made of cheese" is a valid inference. The error in this example is due to a false premise belonging to empirical astronomy.

A central feature of logic is that it is topic-neutral. This means that it is concerned with the validity of arguments independent of the subject matter of these arguments. In this sense, regular sciences are concerned with correct reasoning within a specific area of inquiry, for example, concerning material bodies for classical mechanics or living beings for biology, while logic is concerned with correct reasoning in general as applicable to all these disciplines. One problem with this characterization is that it is not always clear how the terms "topic-neutral" and "subject matter" are to be understood in this context. For example, it could be argued that first-order logic has individuals as its subject matter, due to its usage of singular terms and quantifiers, and is therefore not completely topic-neutral. A closely related characterization holds that logic is concerned with the form of arguments rather than their contents. On this view, the regular sciences could be seen as seeking true premises while logic studies how to draw conclusions from these or any premises. But this characterization also has its problems due to difficulties in distinguishing between form and content. For example, since temporal logic talks about time, this would lead to the implausible conclusion that time belongs to the form and not to the content of arguments. These difficulties have led some theorists to doubt that logic has a clearly specifiable scope or an essential character.

There is wide agreement that logic is a normative discipline. This means that the laws it investigates determine how people should think and that violating these laws is irrational. But there have been individual challenges to this idea. For example, Gilbert Harman claims that deductive logic investigates relations between propositions rather than correct reasoning. He argues that these relations do not directly determine how people should change their beliefs.

=== Logical and non-logical formal systems ===
One approach to determining the nature of logic is to study the different formal systems, referred to as "logics", in order to determine what is essential to all of them, i.e. what makes them logics. Formal systems of logic are systematizations of logical truths based on certain principles called axioms. As for formal logic, a central question in the philosophy of logic is what makes a formal system into a system of logic rather than a collection of mere marks together with rules for how they are to be manipulated. It has been argued that one central requirement is that the marks and how they are manipulated can be interpreted in such a way as to reflect the basic intuitions about valid arguments. This would mean, for example, that there are truth values and that the behavior of some marks corresponds to that of logical operators such as negation or conjunction. Based on this characterization, some theorists hold that certain formal systems, such as three-valued logic or fuzzy logic, stray too far from the common concept of logic to be considered logical systems. Such a position may be defended based on the idea that by rejecting some basic logical assumptions, they include a too radical departure from fundamental logical intuitions to be considered logics. It has been suggested that rejecting the principle of the bivalence of truth, i.e. that propositions are either true or false, constitutes such a case.

Metalogicians sometimes hold that logical completeness is a necessary requirement of logical systems. A formal system is complete if it is possible to derive from its axioms every theorem belonging to it. This would mean that only formal systems that are complete should be understood as constituting logical systems. One controversial argument for this approach is that incomplete theories cannot be fully formalized, which stands in contrast to the formal character of logic. On this view, first-order logic constitutes a logical system. But this would also mean that higher-order "logics" are not logics strictly speaking, due to their incompleteness.

=== Conceptions based on valid inference or logical truth ===
Logic is often defined as the study of valid or correct inferences. On this conception, it is the task of logic to provide a general account of the difference between correct and incorrect inferences. An inference is a set of premises together with a conclusion. An inference is valid if the conclusion follows from the premises, i.e. if the truth of the premises ensures the truth of the conclusion. Another way to define logic is as the study of logical truth. Logical truth is a special form of truth since it does not depend on how things are, i.e. on which possible world is actual. Instead, a logically true proposition is true in all possible worlds. Their truth is based solely on the meanings of the terms they contain, independent of any empirical matters of fact. There is an important link between these two conceptions: an inference from the premises to a conclusion is valid if the material conditional from the premises to the conclusion is logically true. For example, the inference from "roses are red and grass is green" to "roses are red" is valid since the material conditional "if roses are red and grass is green, then roses are red" is logically true.

=== Conceptions based on syntax or semantics ===
Whether logic is defined as the study of valid inference or of logical truth leaves open their exact criteria. There are two important ways of specifying these criteria: the syntactic and the semantic approach, sometimes also called the deductive-theoretic and the model-theoretic approach. In this sense, a logic can be defined as a formal language together with either a deductive-theoretic or a model-theoretic account of logical consequence. The syntactic approach tries to capture these features based only on syntactic or formal features of the premises and the conclusion. This is usually achieved by expressing them through a formal symbolism to make these features explicit and independent of the ambiguities and irregularities of natural language. In this formalism, the validity of arguments only depends on the structure of the argument, specifically on the logical constants used in the premises and the conclusion. On this view, a proposition is a logical consequence of a group of premises if and only if the proposition is deducible from these premises. This deduction happens by using rules of inference. This means that for a valid argument, it is not possible to produce true premises with a false conclusion by substituting their constituents with elements belonging to similar categories while keeping the logical constants in place. In the case of logical truths, such a substitution cannot make them false. Different sets of rules of inference constitute different deductive systems, for example, the ones associated with classical logic or with intuitionistic logic. So whether the proposition is a logical consequence depends not just on the premises but also on the deductive system used.

A problem with the syntactic approach is that the use of formal language is central to it. But the problem of logic, i.e. of valid inference and logical truth, is found not just in formal languages but also in natural languages. However, even within the scope of formal languages, the problem of truth poses a variety of problems, which often call for a richer meta-language to be properly addressed. This threatens the syntactic approach even when restricted to formal languages. Another difficulty is posed by the fact that it is often not clear how to distinguish formal from non-formal features, i.e. logical from non-logical symbols. This distinction lies at the very heart of the syntactic approach due to its role in the definition of valid inference or logical truth.

The semantic approach, on the other hand, focuses on the relation between language and reality. In logic, the study of this relationship is often termed model theory. For this reason, the semantic approach is also referred to as the model-theoretic conception of logic. It was initially conceived by Alfred Tarski and characterizes logical truth not in relation to the logical constants used in sentences, but based on set-theoretic structures that are used to interpret these sentences. The idea behind this approach is that sentences are not true or false by themselves but only true or false in relation to an interpretation. Interpretations are usually understood in set-theoretic terms as functions between symbols used in the sentence and a domain of objects. Such a function assigns individual constants to individual elements of the domain and predicates to tuples of elements of the domain. An interpretation of a sentence (or of a theory comprising various sentences) is called a model of this sentence if the sentence is true according to this interpretation. A sentence is logically true if it is true in every interpretation, i.e. if every interpretation is a model of this sentence. In this case, no matter how the interpretation-function and the domain of objects to which it points are defined, the sentence is always true. If interpretations are understood in terms of possible worlds, logically true sentences can be seen as sentences that are true in every possible world. Expressed in terms of valid arguments: an argument is valid if and only if its conclusion is true in all possible worlds in which its premises are true.

This conception avoids the problems of the syntactic approach associated with the difficulty of distinguishing between logical and non-logical symbols. But it faces other problems of its own. On the one hand, it shares the problem with the syntactic approach of being in need of a meta-language to address the problem of truth. It therefore presupposes a formal language that can be studied from a perspective outside itself. This poses problems for generalizing its insights to the logic of language in general as an all-encompassing medium. On the other hand, it ignores the relationship between language and world, since it defines truth based on the interpretation that takes place only between symbols and set-theoretic objects.

== Types of logics ==
The problem of having to choose between a manifold of rival logical systems is rather recent. For a long time in history, Aristotelian syllogistics was treated as the canon of logic and there were very few substantial improvements to it for over two thousand years until the works of George Boole, Bernard Bolzano, Franz Brentano, Gottlob Frege, and others. These developments were often driven by a need to increase the expressive flexibility of logic and to adapt it to specific areas of usage. A central problem in the philosophy of logic, raised by the contemporary proliferation of logical systems, is to explain how these systems are related to each other. This brings with it the question of why all these formal systems deserve the title "logic". Another question is whether only one of these systems is the right one or how a multiplicity of logical systems is possible instead of just one universal logic. Monism is the thesis that only one logic is correct while pluralism allows different alternative logical systems to be correct for different areas of discourse. It has also been suggested that there may be one universal concept of logic that underlies and unifies all the different logical systems.

=== Formal and informal ===
Logic and the philosophy of logic have traditionally focused primarily on formal arguments, i.e. arguments expressed in a formal language. But they also include the study of informal arguments found in natural language. Formal logic is usually seen as the paradigmatic form of logic but various modern developments have emphasized the importance of informal logic for many practical purposes where formal logic alone is unable to solve all issues by itself. Both formal and informal logic aim at evaluating the correctness of arguments. But formal logic restricts itself concerning the factors that are used in order to provide exact criteria for this evaluation. Informal logic tries to take various additional factors into account and is therefore relevant for many arguments outside the scope of formal logic, but does so at the cost of precision and general rules. Arguments that fail this evaluation are called fallacies. Formal fallacies are fallacies within the scope of formal logic whereas informal fallacies belong to informal logic.

Formal logic is concerned with the validity of inferences or arguments based only on their form, i.e. independent of their specific content and the context in which they are used. This usually happens through abstraction by seeing particular arguments as instances of a certain form of argument. Forms of arguments are defined by how their logical constants and variables are related to each other. In this way, different arguments with very different contents may have the same logical form. Whether an argument is valid only depends on its form. An important feature of formal logic is that for a valid argument, the truth of its premises ensures the truth of its conclusion, i.e. it is impossible for the premises to be true and the conclusion to be false.

A serious problem associated with the usage of formal logic for expressing theories from various fields is that these theories have to be translated into a formal language, usually the language of first-order logic. This is necessary since formal logic is only defined for specific formal language: it is therefore not directly applicable to many arguments expressed differently. Such translations can be challenging since formal languages are often quite restrictive. For example, they frequently lack many of the informal devices found in natural language. One recurrent problem concerns the word "is" in the English language, which has a variety of meanings depending on the context, such as identity, existence, predication, class-inclusion, or location.

Informal logic, on the other hand, has a more concrete orientation in that it tries to evaluate whether a specific instance of an argument is good or bad. This brings with it the need to study not just the general form of the argument in question, but also the contents used as premises of this argument and the context in which this argument is used. This means that the same argument may be both good, when used in one context, and bad, when used in another context. For example, a strawman argument tries to overcome the opponent's position by attributing a weak position to them and then proving this position to be false. In a context where the opponent does not hold this position, the argument is bad, while it may be a good argument against an opponent who actually defends the strawman position. Arguments studied by informal logic are usually expressed in natural language.

Informal logic does not face the need to translate natural language arguments into a formal language in order to be able to evaluate them. This way, it avoids various problems associated with this translation. But this does not solve many of the problems that the usage of natural language brings with it, like ambiguities, vague expressions, or implicitly assuming premises instead of explicitly stating them. Many of the fallacies discussed in informal logic arise directly from these features. This concerns, for example, the fallacies of ambiguity and of presumption.

=== Classical and non-classical ===
Within the domain of formal logic, an important distinction is between classical and non-classical logic. The term classical logic refers primarily to propositional logic and first-order logic. It is the dominant logical system accepted and used by most theorists. But the philosophy of logic is also concerned with non-classical or alternative logics. They are sometimes divided into extended logics and deviant logics. Extended logics are extensions of classical logic, i.e. they accept the basic formalism and axioms of classical logic but extend them with new logical vocabulary, like introducing symbols for "possibility" and "necessity" in modal logic or symbols for "sometimes" and "always" in temporal logic. Deviant logics, on the other hand, reject certain core assumptions of classical logic. They use axioms different from classical logic, which are often more limiting concerning which inferences are valid. They are "deviant" in the sense that they are incompatible with classical logic and may be seen as its rivals.

==== Classical ====
The term classical logic refers primarily to propositional logic and first-order logic. It is usually treated by philosophers as the paradigmatic form of logic and is used in various fields. It is concerned with a small number of central logical concepts and specifies the role these concepts play in making valid inferences. These core notions include quantifiers, expressing ideas like "all" and "some", and propositional connectives, like "and", "or", and "if-then". Among the non-logical concepts, an important distinction is between singular terms and predicates. Singular terms stand for objects and predicates stand for properties of or relations between these objects. In this respect, first-order logic differs from traditional Aristotelian logic, which lacked predicates corresponding to relations. First-order logic allows quantification only over individuals, in contrast to higher-order logic, which allows quantification also over predicates.

==== Extended ====
Extended logics accept the axioms and the core vocabulary of classical logic. This is reflected in the fact that the theorems of classical logic are valid in them. But they go beyond classical logic by including additional new symbols and theorems. The goal of these changes is usually either to apply logical treatment to new areas or to introduce a higher level of abstraction, for example, in the form of quantification applied not just to singular terms but also to predicates or propositions, or through truth predicates. In this sense, deviant logics are usually seen as rivals to classical logic while extended logics are supplements to classical logic. Important examples of extended logics include modal logic and higher-order logic.

The term "modal logic", when understood in its widest sense, refers to a variety of extended logics, such as alethic, deontic, or temporal modal logic. In its narrow sense, it is identical with alethic modal logic. While classical logic is only concerned with what is true or false, alethic modal logic includes new symbols to express what is possibly or necessarily true or false. These symbols take the form of sentential operators. Usually, the symbols "$\Diamond$" and "$\Box$" are used to express that the sentence following them is possibly or necessarily true. Modal logics also include various new rules of inferences specifying how these new symbols figure in valid arguments. One example is the formula $\Box P \rightarrow \Diamond P$, i.e. that if something is necessarily true then it is also possibly true. The other forms of modal logic besides alethic modal logic apply the same principles to different fields. In deontic modal logic, the symbols "$\Diamond$" and "$\Box$" are used to express which actions are permissible or obligatory; in temporal logic, they express what is the case at some time or at every time; in epistemic logic, they express what is compatible with a person's beliefs or what this person knows.

Various rules of inference have been suggested as the basic axioms of the different modal logics but there is no general agreement on which are the right ones. An influential interpretation of modal operators, due to Saul Kripke, understands them as quantifiers over possible worlds. A possible world is a complete and consistent way how things could have been. On this view, to say that something is necessarily true is to say that it is true in all accessible possible worlds. One problem for this type of characterization is that they seem to be circular since possible worlds are themselves defined in modal terms, i.e. as ways how things could have been.

Even when restricted to alethic modal logic, there are again different types of possibility and necessity that can be meant by these terms. For example, according to physical modality, it is necessary that an object falls if dropped since this is what the laws of nature dictate. But according to logical modality, this is not necessary since the laws of nature might have been different without leading to a logical contradiction.

Higher-order logics extend classical first-order predicate logic by including new forms of quantification. In first-order logic, quantification is restricted to individuals, like in the formula $\exists x (Apple(x) \land Sweet(x))$ (there are some apples that are sweet). Higher-order logics allow quantification not just over individuals but also over predicates, as in $\exists P (P(mary) \land P(john))$ (there are some qualities that Mary and John share). The increased expressive power of higher-order logics is especially relevant for mathematics. For example, an infinite number of axioms is necessary for Peano arithmetic and Zermelo-Fraenkel set theory in first-order logic, while second-order logic only needs a handful of axioms to do the same job. But this increased expressive power comes at certain costs. On the one hand, higher-order theories are incomplete: it is not possible to prove every true sentence based on the axioms of this theory. For theories in first-order logic, on the other hand, this is possible. Another drawback is that higher-order logics seem to be committed to a form of Platonism since they quantify not just over individuals but also over properties and relations.

==== Deviant ====
Deviant logics are forms of logic in that they have the same goal as classical logic: to give an account of which inferences are valid. They differ from classical logic by giving a different account. Intuitionistic logic, for example, rejects the law of excluded middle, which is a valid form of inference in classical logic. This rejection is based on the idea that mathematical truth depends on verification through a proof. The law fails for cases where no such proof is possible, which exist in every sufficiently strong formal system, according to Gödel's incompleteness theorems. Free logic differs from classical logic since it has fewer existential presuppositions: it allows non-denoting expressions, i.e. individual terms that do not refer to objects within the domain. A central motivation for this type of modification is that free logic can be used to analyze discourse with empty singular terms, like in the expression "Santa Claus does not exist". Many-valued logic is a logic that allows for additional truth values besides true and false in classical logic. In this sense, it rejects the principle of the bivalence of truth. In a simple form of three-valued logic, for example, a third truth value is introduced: undefined.

== Fundamental concepts ==
=== Truth ===
In logic, truth is usually seen as a property of propositions or sentences. It plays a central role in logic since validity is often defined in terms of truth: an inference is valid if and only if it is impossible for its premises to be true and its conclusion to be false. Theories of truth try to characterize the nature of truth. According to correspondence theories, a proposition is true if it corresponds to reality, i.e. if it represents things how they actually are. Coherence theories, on the other hand, identify truth with coherence. On this view, a proposition is true if it is a coherent part of a specified set of propositions, i.e. if these propositions are consistent with each other and provide mutual inferential support for each other. According to pragmatic theories of truth, whether a proposition is true depends on its relation to practice. Some versions claim that a proposition is true if believing it is useful, if it is the ideal result of an endless inquiry, or if it meets the standards of warranted assertibility. Deflationary theories of truth see truth as a rather empty notion that lacks an interesting nature of its own. On this view, to assert that a proposition is true is the same as asserting the proposition by itself. Other important topics in the philosophy of logic concerning truth are the value of truth, the liar paradox, and the principle of bivalence of truth.

==== Logical truth ====
Central to logic is the notion of logical truth. Logical truth is often understood in terms of the analytic-synthetic distinction: a proposition is analytically true if its truth only depends on the meanings of the terms composing it. Synthetic propositions, on the other hand, are characterized by the fact that their truth depends on non-logical or empirical factors. This is sometimes expressed by stating that analytical truths are tautologies, whose denial would imply a contradiction, while it is possible for synthetic propositions to be true or false. In this sense, the proposition "all bachelors are unmarried" is analytically true since being unmarried is part of how the term "bachelor" is defined. The proposition "some bachelors are happy", on the other hand, is synthetically true since it depends on empirical factors not included in the meaning of its terms. But whether this distinction is tenable has been put into question. For example, Willard Van Orman Quine has argued that there are no purely analytic truths, i.e. that all propositions are to some extent empirical. But others have explicitly defended the analytic-synthetic distinction against Quine's criticism.

But whether logical truths can be identified with analytical truths is not always accepted. A different approach characterizes logical truths regarding a small subset of the meanings of all terms: the so-called logical constants or syncategoremata. They include propositional connectives, like "and" or "if-then", quantifiers, like "for some" or "for all", and identity. Propositional logic is only concerned with truth in virtue of propositional connectives, while predicate logic also investigates truths based on the usage of quantifiers and identity. Extended logics introduce even more logical constants, like possibility and necessity in modal logic. A sentence is true in virtue of the logical constants alone if all non-logical terms can be freely replaced by other terms of the appropriate type without affecting any change in the truth value of the sentence. For example, the sentence "if it rains, then it rains" is true due to its logical form alone because all such replacements, like substituting the expression "Socrates is wise" for the expression "it rains", also result in true sentences. One problem with this characterization of logic is that it is not always clear how to draw the distinction between logical constants and other symbols. While there is little controversy in the paradigmatic cases, there are various borderline cases in which there seem to be no good criteria for deciding the issue.

=== Premises and conclusions ===
There are various discussions about the nature of premises and conclusions. It is widely agreed that they have to be bearers of truth, i.e. that they are either true or false. This is necessary so they can fulfill their logical role. They are traditionally understood as thoughts or propositions, i.e. as mental or abstract objects. This approach has been rejected by various philosophers since it has proven difficult to specify clear identity criteria for these types of entities. An alternative approach holds that only sentences can act as premises and conclusions. Propositions are closely related to sentences since they are the meaning of sentences: sentences express propositions. But this approach faces various problems of its own. One is due to the fact that the meaning of sentences usually is context-dependent. Because of this, it could be the case that the same inference is valid in one context and invalid in another. Another problem consists in the fact that some sentences are ambiguous, i.e. that it sometimes depends on one's interpretation whether an inference is valid.

An important aspect both of propositions and of sentences is that they can be either simple or complex. Complex propositions are made up of simple propositions that are linked to each other through propositional connectives. Simple propositions do not have other propositions as their parts. Still, they are usually understood as being constituted by other entities as well: by subpropositional parts like singular terms and predicates. For example, the simple proposition "Mars is red" is made of the singular term "Mars", to which the predicate "red" is applied. In contrast, the proposition "Mars is red and Venus is white" is made up of two propositions connected by the propositional connective "and". In the simplest case, these connectives are truth-functional connectives: the truth value of the complex proposition is a function of the truth values of its constituents. So the proposition "Mars is red and Venus is white" is true because the two propositions constituting it are true. The truth value of simple propositions, on the other hand, depends on their subpropositional parts. This is usually understood in terms of reference: their truth is determined by how their subpropositional parts are related to the world, i.e. to the extra-linguistic objects they refer to. This relation is studied by theories of reference, which try to specify how singular terms refer to objects and how predicates apply to these objects. In the case of singular terms, popular suggestions include that the singular term refers to its object either through a definite description or based on causal relations with it. In the former sense, the name "Aristotle" may be understood as the definite description "the pupil of Plato who taught Alexander". As for predicates, they are often seen as referring either to universals, to concepts, or to classes of objects.

=== Inference and argument ===
An inference is the process of reasoning from premises to a conclusion. The relation between the premises and the conclusion is called "entailment" or "logical consequence". An argument consists of the premises, the conclusion, and the relation between them. But the terms "inference", "argument", "entailment", and "logical consequence" are often used interchangeably. A complex argument is an argument involving several steps, in which the conclusions of earlier steps figure as the premises of the following steps. Inferences and arguments can be correct or incorrect. This depends on whether the premises actually support the conclusion, i.e. on whether the conclusion follows from the premises. For example, it follows from "Kelly is not both at home and at work" and "Kelly is at home" that "Kelly is not at work". But it does not follow that "Kelly is a football fan".

An important distinction among inferences is between deductive and ampliative inferences, also referred to as monotonic and non-monotonic inferences. According to Alfred Tarski, deductive inference has three central features: (1) it is formal, i.e. it depends only on the form of the premises and the conclusion; (2) it is a priori, i.e. no sense experience is needed to determine whether it obtains; (3) it is modal, i.e. that it holds by necessity for the given propositions, independent of any other circumstances. Deductive inferences are necessarily truth-preserving: the conclusion cannot be false if all the premises are true. For this reason, they are unable to introduce new information not already found in the premises and are uninformative in this sense. One problem with characterizing deductive inferences as uninformative is that this seems to suggest that they are useless, i.e. it fails to explain why someone would use or study them. This difficulty can be addressed by distinguishing between depth information and surface information. On this view, deductive logic is uninformative on the level of depth information but may still lead to surprising results on the level of surface information by presenting certain aspects in a new way.

Ampliative inferences, on the other hand, are informative by aiming to provide new information. This happens at the cost of losing the necessarily truth-preserving nature. The most prominent form of ampliative inference is induction. An inductive inference involves particular propositions as premises, which are used to infer either one more particular proposition or a generalization as the conclusion. Deductive inferences are the paradigmatic form of inference and are the main focus of logic. But many inferences drawn in the empirical sciences and in everyday discourse are ampliative inferences.

=== Validity and fallacies ===
A central problem in logic is how to distinguish correct or valid arguments from incorrect or invalid ones. The philosophy of logic investigates issues like what it means that an argument is valid. This includes the question of how this type of support is to be understood or of what the criteria are under which a premise supports a conclusion. Some logicians define valid inference or entailment in terms of logical necessity: the premises entail the conclusion if it is impossible for the premises to be true and the conclusion to be false. This can also be expressed by saying that the conjunction of the premises and the negation of the conclusion is logically impossible. This conception brings with it the principle of explosion, i.e. that anything follows from a contradiction. But valid inferences can also be characterized in terms of rules of inference. Rules of inference govern the transition from the premises to the conclusion. On this view, an inference is valid if it is in accordance with an appropriate rule of inference.

Closely related to the notion of valid inference is that of confirmation. Valid inferences belong to formal logic and is associated with deductively valid arguments. But many arguments found in the sciences and in everyday discourse support their conclusion without ensuring its truth. They fall in the purview of informal logic and can also be divided into good and bad arguments. In this sense, for example, observations may act as empirical evidence supporting a scientific hypothesis. This is often understood in terms of probability, i.e. that the evidence increases the likelihood that the hypothesis is true.

Of special interest are the so-called fallacies, i.e. incorrect arguments that appear to be correct. They are incorrect because the premises do not support the conclusion in the assumed way. Due to their misleading appearance, they can seduce people into accepting and using them. Often three factors are identified as the sources of the error: form, content, and context. The form of an argument refers to its structure, i.e. which rule of inference it employs. Errors on the level of form involve the use of invalid rules of inference. An argument that is incorrect on the level of content uses false propositions as its premises. The context of an argument refers to the situation in which it is used and the role it is supposed to play. An argument can be fallacious if it fails to play the role intended for it, as in the strawman fallacy, when the arguer attacks an overly weak position not held by the opponent.

An important distinction among fallacies can be drawn based on these sources of error: that between formal and informal fallacies. Formal fallacies pertain to formal logic and involve only errors of form by employing an invalid rule of inference. Denying the antecedent is one type of formal fallacy, for example, "If Othello is a bachelor, then he is male. Othello is not a bachelor. Therefore, Othello is not male". Informal fallacies belong to informal logic and their main source of error is found on the level of content and context. False dilemmas, for example, are based on a false disjunctive premise that oversimplifies reality by excluding viable alternatives, as in "Stacey spoke out against capitalism; therefore, she must be a communist".

Since logic evaluates arguments as good or bad, logic faces the problem of the nature and justification of the norms guiding these evaluations. This is similar to issues found in metaethics about how to justify moral norms. One approach to this issue is to characterize the norms of logic as generalizations of the inferential practices found in natural language or the sciences. This way, justification is inherited from the evaluations of good and bad inferences used in the corresponding field.

=== Definitory and strategic rules ===
An important distinction among the rules of logic is that between definitory and strategic rules. Rules of inferences are definitory rules: they govern which inferences are valid. And while it has been the main objective of logic to distinguish valid from invalid inferences, there is also a secondary objective often associated with logic: to determine which inferential steps are needed to prove or disprove a given proposition based on a set of premises. This is the domain of strategic rules. The rules of inference specify which steps are allowed but they remain silent on which steps need to be taken to reach a certain conclusion. The difference between definitory and strategic rules is found not only in logic but in various games as well. In chess, for example, the definitory rules specify that bishops may only move diagonally while strategic rules describe how the allowed moves may be used to win a game, e.g. by controlling the center or by protecting one's king. Following definitory rules determines whether one plays chess or something else while following strategic rules determines whether one is a good or a bad chess player. Both definitory and strategic rules are to be distinguished from empirical descriptive rules, which generalize how people actually draw inferences, whether correct or incorrect. In this sense, definitory rules are permissive and strategic rules are prescriptive while empirical generalizations are descriptive. Violating the definitory rules of logic results in committing fallacies. It has been argued that the almost exclusive focus of logicians on the definitory rules of logic is not justified. On this view, more emphasis should be given to strategic rules instead, since many applications of logic, like the problem of rational belief change, depend more on strategic rules than on definitory rules.

== Metaphysics of logic ==
The philosophy of logic is in many ways closely related to the philosophy of mathematics, especially in relation to their metaphysical aspects. The metaphysics of logic is concerned with the metaphysical status of its objects and the laws governing them. The theories within the metaphysics of logic can roughly be divided into realist and non-realist positions.

Logical realists hold that the laws of logic are objective, i.e. independent of humans and their ways of thinking. On this view, the structures found in logic are structures of the world itself. According to a definition proposed by Sandra LaPointe, logical realism consists of two theses: that there are logical facts and that they are independent of our cognitive and linguistic make-up and practices. Logical realism is often interpreted from the perspective of Platonism, i.e. that there is an intelligible realm of abstract objects that includes the objects of logic. On this view, logic is not invented but discovered. An important consequence of this position is that there is a clear gap between the facts of logic themselves and our beliefs about these facts. One difficulty of this position consists in clarifying which sense of independence is meant when saying that logic is independent of humans. If it is understood in the strictest sense possible, no knowledge of it would be possible since a fully independent reality could play no part in human consciousness. Another problem is to explain the relation between the one world and the many different logical systems proposed. This would suggest that there is only one true logic and all other logical systems are either false or incomplete.

Logical realism is rejected by anti-realists, who hold that logic does not describe an objective feature of reality. Anti-realism about logic often takes the form of conceptualism or psychologism, in which the objects of logic consist in mental conceptions or the logical laws are identified with psychological laws. This can include the thesis that the laws of logic are not knowable a priori, as is often held, but that they are discovered through the methods of experimental inquiry. An argument for psychologism is based on the idea that logic is a sub-discipline of psychology: it studies not all laws of thought, but only the subset of laws corresponding to valid reasoning. Another argument focuses on the thesis that we learn about logical truths through the feeling of self-evidence, which is in turn studied by psychology. Various objections to psychologism have been raised, especially in German philosophy around the turn of the 20th century in the so-called "Psychologismus-Streit". One objection focuses on the thesis that the laws of logic are known a priori, which is not true for the empirical laws studied by psychology. Another points out that psychological laws are usually vague, whereas logic is an exact science with clear laws.

Conventionalism is another form of anti-realism, in which the logical truths depend on the meanings of the terms used, which in turn depend on linguistic conventions adopted by a group of agents. One problem for this position consists in providing a clear definition of the term "convention". Conventions are widely observed regularities. But not every widely observed regularity is a convention: conventions include a certain normative factor that distinguishes right from wrong behavior, whereas irregular behavior is not automatically wrong. Another problem concerns the fact that conventions are contingent, while logical truths are necessary. This casts doubt on the possibility of defining logical truth in terms of convention unless a plausible explanation could be given how contingent conventions can ground necessary truths.

== Relation to other disciplines ==
=== Ontology ===
A central issue in ontology is the problem of existence, i.e. whether an entity or a certain kind of entity exists. According to some theorists, the main goal of ontology is just to determine what exists and what does not exist. The issue of existence is closely related to singular terms, like names, and existential quantifiers ($\exists x$): it is often held that these devices carry existential presuppositions or ontological commitments with them. On this view, sentences like "$\exists x (Apple(x))$" and "$Horse(pegasus)$" involve ontological commitments to the existence of apples and of Pegasus, respectively. The most famous defender of this approach is Willard Van Orman Quine, who argues that the ontological commitments of any theory can be determined by translating it into first-order logic and reading them off from the existential quantifiers used in this translation.

One problem with this approach is that it can lead to various controversial ontological commitments. Mathematics, for example, quantifies over numbers in sentences such as "there are prime numbers between 1000 and 1010". This would mean that the ontological commitment to the existence of numbers, i.e. realism about numbers, is already built into mathematics. Another problem is due to the fact that natural language contains many names for imaginary entities, such as Pegasus or Santa Claus. But if names come with existential commitments, then sentences like "Santa Claus does not exist" would be contradictory. Within ontology, these problems are sometimes approached through Platonism or psychologism by holding that the problematic entities do exist, but only in the form of abstract or mental objects while lacking concrete or material existence. Within logic, these problems can be avoided by using certain forms of non-classical logic. Free logic, for example, allows empty singular terms, which do not denote any object in the domain and therefore carry no ontological commitments. This is often combined with an existence-predicate, which can be used to specify whether a singular term denotes an object in the domain. But talk of existence as a predicate is controversial. Opponents of this approach often point out that existence is required for an object to have any predicates at all and can therefore not be one of them.

The issue of existence brings with it its own problems in the case of higher-order logics. Second-order logic, for example, includes existential quantification not just for singular terms but also for predicates. This is often understood as entailing ontological commitments not just to regular objects but also to the properties and relations instantiated by these objects. This position is known as realism and is often rejected in contemporary philosophy due to naturalist considerations. It contrasts with nominalism, the view that only individuals exist.

=== Mathematics ===
Mathematics and logic are related in various ways. Both are considered formal sciences and in many cases, developments in these two fields happened in parallel. Propositional logic, for example, is an instance of Boolean algebra. It is often claimed that mathematics can, in principle, be grounded in only first-order logic together with set theory. Metamath is one example of such a project. It is based on 20 axioms of propositional logic, first-order predicate logic, and Zermelo–Fraenkel set theory and has already proved a significant amount of mathematical theorems based on these axioms. Closely related to this project is logicism: the thesis defended by Gottfried Wilhelm Leibniz and Gottlob Frege that arithmetic is reducible to logic alone. This would mean that any statement in arithmetic, like "2 + 2 = 4", can be expressed in purely logical terms, i.e. without using numbers or arithmetic operators like addition. In this case, all the theorems of arithmetic would be derivable from the axioms of logic. Whether this thesis is correct depends on how the term "logic" is understood. If "logic" only refers to the axioms of first-order predicate logic, it is false. But if one includes set-theory in it or higher-order logic, then arithmetic is reducible to logic.

=== Computer science ===
An important relation between logic and computer science arises from the parallels between propositional connectives of propositional logic and logic gates in computer science: they both follow the laws of Boolean algebra. Propositions are either false or true while the inputs and outputs of logic gates are termed 0 and 1. Both use truth tables to illustrate the functioning of propositional connectives and logic gates. Another important relation to logic consists in the development of logic software that can assist logicians in formulating proofs or even automate the process. Prover9 is an example of an automated theorem prover for first-order logic.

=== Psychology ===
A very close connection between psychology and logic can be drawn if logic is seen as the science of the laws of thought. One important difference between psychology and logic in the light of this characterization is that psychology is an empirical science that aims to study how humans actually think. Logic, on the other hand, has the objective of discovering the laws of correct reasoning, independently of whether actual human thinking often falls short of this ideal. The psychologist Jean Piaget applied logic to psychology by using it to identify different stages of human psychological development. On his view, the ability to reason logically only arises at a certain stage in the child's development and can be used as a criterion to distinguish it from earlier stages.

== See also ==
=== Important theorists ===
- Agata Ciabattoni
- Alfred Tarski
- Alonzo Church
- Alvin Plantinga
- Aristotle
- Arthur Prior
- Augustus De Morgan
- Bertrand Russell
- Charles Sanders Peirce
- David Lewis
- Donald Davidson
- Georg Hegel
- George Boole
- George Boolos
- Gordon Clark
- Gottfried Leibniz
- Gottlob Frege
- Hilary Putnam
- Immanuel Kant
- John Buridan
- John Stuart Mill
- Kurt Gödel
- Ludwig Wittgenstein
- Michael Dummett
- Noriko H. Arai
- Peter of Spain
- Rudolf Carnap
- Saul Kripke
- Valeria de Paiva
- Willard Van Orman Quine
- William of Ockham

=== Philosophical theories of logic ===
- Conceptualism
- Constructivism
- Dialetheism
- Formalism
- Intuitionism
- Realism
- Platonic realism

=== Others ===
- "Is Logic Empirical?"
- Bas van Fraassen § Singular Terms, Truth-value Gaps, and Free Logic
- Extension and Intension
- Logic translation
- Logical connective
- Logical constant
- Logical harmony
- Quantifier (logic)
- Semantic theory of truth § Tarski's Theory
- Sense and reference
- Supposition theory
- The Foundations of Arithmetic § Development of Frege's own view of a number
- Theory of reference
