= Beth definability theorem =

In mathematical logic, the Beth definability theorem is a fundamental result in logic that states a property implicitly defined by a first-order theory has an explicit definition within that theory. This means that if a new symbol or property is uniquely determined across all models of a theory, there must be a formula using only the existing symbols of the theory that defines it. The theorem establishes an equivalence between implicit and explicit definability in classical first-order logic, linking its syntax (proofs) and semantics (models).

== Statement ==
For first-order logic, the theorem states that, given a theory T in the language L' ⊇ L and a formula φ in L', then the following are equivalent:

- for any two models A and B of T such that A|L = B|L (where A|L is the reduct of A to L), it is the case that A ⊨ φ[a] if and only if B ⊨ φ[a] (for all tuples a of elements of A with length equal to the number of free variables of φ);
- φ is equivalent modulo T to a formula ψ in L.

Less formally: a property is implicitly definable in a theory in language L (via a formula φ of an extended language L') only if that property is explicitly definable in that theory (by formula ψ in the original language L).

Clearly the converse holds as well, so that we have an equivalence between implicit and explicit definability. That is, a "property" is explicitly definable with respect to a theory if and only if it is implicitly definable.

The theorem does not hold if the condition is restricted to finite models. We may have A ⊨ φ[a] if and only if B ⊨ φ[a] for all pairs A,B of finite models without there being any L-formula ψ equivalent to φ modulo T.

The result was first proven by Evert Willem Beth in a paper published in 1953.

== See also ==
- Structure (mathematical logic) – Mapping of mathematical formulas to a particular meaning

== Sources ==
- Wilfrid Hodges A Shorter Model Theory. Cambridge University Press, 1997.
