= Descriptive interpretation =

Term in logic

According to Rudolf Carnap, in logic, an interpretation is a descriptive interpretation (also called a factual interpretation) if at least one of the undefined symbols of its formal system becomes, in the interpretation, a descriptive sign (i.e., the name of single objects, or observable properties). In his Introduction to Semantics (Harvard Uni. Press, 1942) he makes a distinction between formal interpretations which are logical interpretations (also called mathematical interpretation or logico-mathematical interpretation) and descriptive interpretations: a formal interpretation is a descriptive interpretation if it is not a logical interpretation.

Attempts to axiomatize the empirical sciences, Carnap said, use a descriptive interpretation to model reality.: the aim of these attempts is to construct a formal system for which reality is the only interpretation. - the world is an interpretation (or model) of these sciences, only insofar as these sciences are true.

Any non-empty set may be chosen as the domain of a descriptive interpretation, and all n-ary relations among the elements of the domain are candidates for assignment to any predicate of degree n.

== Examples ==
A sentence is either true or false under an interpretation which assigns values to the logical variables. We might for example make the following assignments:

Individual constants

- a: Socrates
- b: Plato
- c: Aristotle

Predicates:

- Fα: α is sleeping
- Gαβ: α hates β
- Hαβγ: α made β hit γ

Sentential variables:

- p "It is raining."

Under this interpretation the sentences discussed above would represent the following English statements:

- p: "It is raining."
- F(a): "Socrates is sleeping."
- H(b,a,c): "Plato made Socrates hit Aristotle."
- $\forall$x(F(x)): "Everybody is sleeping."
- $\exists$z(G(a,z)): "Socrates hates somebody."
- $\exists$x$\forall$y$\exists$z(H(x,y,z)): "Somebody made everybody hit somebody."
- $\forall$x$\exists$z(F(x)$\wedge$G(a,z)): Everybody is sleeping and Socrates hates somebody.
- $\exists$x$\forall$y$\exists$z (G(a,z)$\lor$H(x,y,z)): Either Socrates hates somebody or somebody made everybody hit somebody.
