= Free function =

Free function may refer to

- an uninterpreted function in mathematics
- a non-member function in the C++ programming language
