= Corine Besson =

American philosopher

Corine Beson
- Occupation: Philosopher
- Known for: Epistemology; Philosophical Logic

Academic background
- Education: University of Geneva; University of Oxford

Academic work
- Institutions: University of Sussex; University of Oxford; Birkbeck College London

Corine Besson is a British philosopher and professor with a focus on epistemology, the philosophy of logic and the philosophy of language. Besson is one of the directors of the Centre for Logic, Language and Information (CeLLi) at the School of Advanced Study, University of London, which provides seminars on and research into philosophical debates.
