= Interpretation (model theory) =

Concept in model theory

In model theory, interpretation of a structure M in another structure N (typically of a different signature) is a technical notion that approximates the idea of representing M inside N. For example, every reduct or definitional expansion of a structure N has an interpretation in N.

Many model-theoretic properties are preserved under interpretability. For example, if the theory of N is stable and M is interpretable in N, then the theory of M is also stable.

Note that in other areas of mathematical logic, the term "interpretation" may refer to a structure, rather than being used in the sense defined here. These two notions of "interpretation" are related but nevertheless distinct. Similarly, "interpretability" may refer to a related but distinct notion about representation and provability of sentences between theories.

== Definition ==
An interpretation of a structure M in a structure N with parameters (or without parameters, respectively) is a pair $(n,f)$ where n is a natural number and $f$ is a surjective map from a subset of N^{n} onto M such that the $f$-preimage (more precisely the $f^k$-preimage) of every set X ⊆ M^{k} definable in M by a first-order formula without parameters is definable (in N) by a first-order formula with parameters (or without parameters, respectively). Since the value of n for an interpretation $(n,f)$ is often clear from context, the map $f$ itself is also called an interpretation.

To verify that the preimage of every definable (without parameters) set in M is definable in N (with or without parameters), it is sufficient to check the preimages of the following definable sets:

- the domain of M;
- the diagonal of M^{2};
- every relation in the signature of M;
- the graph of every function in the signature of M.

In model theory the term definable often refers to definability with parameters; if this convention is used, definability without parameters is expressed by the term 0-definable. Similarly, an interpretation with parameters may be referred to as simply an interpretation, and an interpretation without parameters as a 0-interpretation.

== Bi-interpretability ==
If L, M and N are three structures, L is interpreted in M, and M is interpreted in N, then one can naturally construct a composite interpretation of L in N. If two structures M and N are interpreted in each other, then by combining the interpretations in two possible ways, one obtains an interpretation of each of the two structures in itself. This observation permits one to define an equivalence relation among structures, reminiscent of the homotopy equivalence among topological spaces.

Two structures M and N are bi-interpretable if there exists an interpretation of M in N and an interpretation of N in M such that the composite interpretations of M in itself and of N in itself are definable in M and in N, respectively (the composite interpretations being viewed as operations on M and on N).

== Example ==
The partial map f from Z × Z onto Q that maps (x, y) to x/y if y ≠ 0 provides an interpretation of the field Q of rational numbers in the ring Z of integers (to be precise, the interpretation is (2, f)). In fact, this particular interpretation is often used to define the rational numbers. To see that it is an interpretation (without parameters), one needs to check the following preimages of definable sets in Q:

- the preimage of Q is defined by the formula φ(x, y) given by ¬ (y = 0);
- the preimage of the diagonal of Q is defined by the formula φ(x_{1}, y_{1}, x_{2}, y_{2}) given by x_{1} × y_{2} = x_{2} × y_{1};
- the preimages of 0 and 1 are defined by the formulas φ(x, y) given by x = 0 and x = y;
- the preimage of the graph of addition is defined by the formula φ(x_{1}, y_{1}, x_{2}, y_{2}, x_{3}, y_{3}) given by x_{1}×y_{2}×y_{3} + x_{2}×y_{1}×y_{3} = x_{3}×y_{1}×y_{2};
- the preimage of the graph of multiplication is defined by the formula φ(x_{1}, y_{1}, x_{2}, y_{2}, x_{3}, y_{3}) given by x_{1}×x_{2}×y_{3} = x_{3}×y_{1}×y_{2}.
