= Equational logic =

Branch of logic

First-order equational logic consists of quantifier-free terms of ordinary first-order logic, with equality as the only predicate symbol. The model theory of this logic was developed into universal algebra by Birkhoff, Grätzer, and Cohn. It was later made into a branch of category theory by Lawvere ("algebraic theories").

The terms of equational logic are built up from variables and constants using function symbols (or operations).

== Syllogism ==
Here are the four inference rules of logic. $P[x := E]$ denotes textual substitution of expression $E$ for variable $x$ in expression $P$. Next, $b = c$ denotes equality, for $b$ and $c$ of the same type, while $b \equiv c$, or equivalence, is defined only for $b$ and $c$ of type boolean. For $b$ and $c$ of type boolean, $b = c$ and $b \equiv c$ have the same meaning.

Substitution	If $P$ is a theorem, then so is $P[x := E]$.	$$\vdash P \qquad \rightarrow \qquad \vdash P[x := E]$$
Leibniz	If $P = Q$ is a theorem, then so is $E[x:= P] = E[x:= Q]$.	$$\vdash P = Q \qquad \rightarrow \qquad \vdash E[x := P] = E[x := Q]$$
Transitivity	If $P = Q$ and $Q = R$ are theorems, then so is $P = R$.	$$\vdash P = Q, \; \vdash Q = R \qquad \rightarrow \qquad \vdash P = R$$
Equanimity	If $P$ and $P \equiv Q$ are theorems, then so is $Q$.	$$\vdash P, \; \vdash P \equiv Q \qquad \rightarrow \qquad \vdash Q$$

== Proof ==
We explain how the four inference rules are used in proofs, using the proof of $\lnot p \equiv p \equiv \bot$. The logic symbols $\top$ and $\bot$ indicate "true" and "false," respectively, and $\lnot$ indicates "not." The theorem numbers refer to theorems of A Logical Approach to Discrete Math.

$$\begin{array}{lcl}
(0) & & \lnot p \equiv p \equiv \bot \\
(1) & = & \quad \left\langle\; (3.9),\; \lnot(p \equiv q) \equiv \lnot p \equiv q,\; \text{with}\ q := p \;\right\rangle \\
(2) & & \lnot (p \equiv p) \equiv \bot \\
(3) & = & \quad \left\langle\; \text{Identity of}\ \equiv (3.9),\; \text{with}\ q := p \;\right\rangle \\
(4) & & \lnot \top \equiv \bot & (3.8)
\end{array}$$

First, lines $(0)$–$(2)$ show a use of inference rule Leibniz:

$$(0) = (2)$$

is the conclusion of Leibniz, and its premise $\lnot(p \equiv p) \equiv \lnot p \equiv p$ is given on line $(1)$. In the same way, the equality on lines $(2)$–$(4)$ are substantiated using Leibniz.

The "hint" on line $(1)$ is supposed to give a premise of Leibniz, showing what substitution of equals for equals is being used. This premise is theorem $(3.9)$ with the substitution $p := q$, i.e.

$$(\lnot(p \equiv q) \equiv \lnot p \equiv q)[p := q]$$

This shows how inference rule Substitution is used within hints.

From $(0) = (2)$ and $(2) = (4)$, we conclude by inference rule Transitivity that $(0) = (4)$. This shows how Transitivity is used.

Finally, note that line $(4)$, $\lnot \top \equiv \bot$, is a theorem, as indicated by the hint to its right. Hence, by inference rule Equanimity, we conclude that line $(0)$ is also a theorem. And $(0)$ is what we wanted to prove.

== See also ==
- Theory of pure equality
