= Normal model =

Normal model may refer to:

- Normal distribution, a type of continuous probability distribution
- A model of interpreting equality (see Interpretation (logic)#Interpreting equality)
