= Sentence (mathematical logic) =

In mathematical logic, a well-formed formula with no free variables

In mathematical logic, a sentence (or closed formula) of a predicate logic is a Boolean-valued well-formed formula with no free variables. A sentence can be viewed as expressing a proposition, something that must be true or false. The restriction of having no free variables is needed to make sure that sentences can have concrete, fixed truth values: as the free variables of a (general) formula can range over several values, the truth value of such a formula may vary.

Sentences without any logical connectives or quantifiers in them are known as atomic sentences; by analogy to atomic formula. Sentences are then built up out of atomic sentences by applying connectives and quantifiers.

A set of sentences is called a theory; thus, individual sentences may be called theorems. To properly evaluate the truth (or falsehood) of a sentence, one must make reference to an interpretation of the theory. For first-order theories, interpretations are commonly called structures. Given a structure or interpretation, a sentence will have a fixed truth value. A theory is satisfiable when it is possible to present an interpretation in which all of its sentences are true. The study of algorithms to automatically discover interpretations of theories that render all sentences as being true is known as the satisfiability modulo theories problem.

== Example ==
For the interpretation of formulas, a domain of discourse must be given, such as the positive real numbers, the real numbers, and complex numbers. The following example in first-order logic

$$\forall y \ \exists x \ (y=x^2)$$

is a sentence. This sentence means that for every y, there is an x such that $y=x^{2}.$ This sentence is true for positive real numbers, false for real numbers, and true for complex numbers.

However, the formula

$$\exists x \ (y=x^2)$$

is not a sentence because of the presence of the free variable y. For real numbers, this formula is true if we substitute (arbitrarily) $y=2,$ but is false if $y=-2.$

It is the presence of a free variable, rather than the inconstant truth value, that is important; for example, even for complex numbers, where the formula is always true, it is still not considered a sentence. Such a formula may be called a predicate instead.

== See also ==
- Ground expression
- Open formula
- Statement (logic)
- Proposition
