= Opaque predicate =

In computer programming, an opaque predicate is a predicate, an expression that evaluates to either "true" or "false", for which the outcome is known by the programmer a priori, but which, for a variety of reasons, still needs to be evaluated at run time. Opaque predicates have been used as watermarks, as they will be identifiable in a program's executable. They can also be used to prevent an overzealous optimizer from optimizing away a portion of a program. Another use is in obfuscating the control or dataflow of a program to make reverse engineering harder.
