= Non-logical symbol =

Symbols requiring interpretation

In mathematical logic, especially model theory, non-logical symbols are elements of a formal language whose interpretation may change depending on the model. In first-order logic, these usually consist of constant symbols, function symbols, and predicates. This is in contrast to logical constants which are required to have the same interpretation under every model, such as logical connectives and quantifiers.

A non-logical symbol only has meaning or semantic content when one is assigned to it by means of an interpretation. Consequently, a sentence containing a non-logical symbol lacks meaning except under an interpretation, so a sentence is said to be true or false under an interpretation. These concepts are defined and discussed in the article on first-order logic, and in particular the section on syntax.

The equality symbol is sometimes treated as a non-logical symbol and sometimes treated as a symbol of logic. If it is treated as a logical symbol, then any interpretation will be required to interpret the equality sign using true equality; if interpreted as a non-logical symbol, it may be interpreted by an arbitrary equivalence relation.

== Signatures ==
A signature is a set of non-logical constants together with additional information identifying each symbol as either a constant symbol, or a function symbol of a specific arity n (a natural number), or a relation symbol of a specific arity. The additional information controls how the non-logical symbols can be used to form terms and formulas. For instance if f is a binary function symbol and c is a constant symbol, then f(x, c) is a term, but c(x, f) is not a term. Relation symbols cannot be used in terms, but they can be used to combine one or more (depending on the arity) terms into an atomic formula.

For example a signature could consist of a binary function symbol +, a constant symbol 0, and a binary relation symbol <.

== Models ==
Structures over a signature, also known as models, provide formal semantics to a signature and the first-order language over it.

A structure over a signature consists of a set $D$ (known as the domain of discourse) together with interpretations of the non-logical symbols: Every constant symbol is interpreted by an element of $D$ and the interpretation of an $n$-ary function symbol is an $n$-ary function on $D;$ that is, a function $D^n \to D$ from the $n$-fold cartesian product of the domain to the domain itself. Every $n$-ary relation symbol is interpreted by an $n$-ary relation on the domain; that is, by a subset of $D^n.$

An example of a structure over the signature mentioned above is the ordered group of integers. Its domain is the set $\Z = \{\ldots, -2, -1, 0, 1, 2, \ldots\}$ of integers. The binary function symbol $+$ is interpreted by addition, the constant symbol 0 by the additive identity, and the binary relation symbol < by the relation less than.

== Descriptive signs ==
Rudolf Carnap introduced a terminology distinguishing between logical and non-logical symbols (which he called descriptive signs) of a formal system under a certain type of interpretation, defined by what they describe in the world.

A descriptive sign is defined as any symbol of a formal language which designates things or processes in the world, or properties or relations of things. This is in contrast to logical signs which do not designate any thing in the world of objects. The use of logical signs is determined by the logical rules of the language, whereas meaning is arbitrarily attached to descriptive signs when they are applied to a given domain of individuals.

== See also ==
- Logical constant
