= Reduct =

Omission of operations and relations of a structure

In universal algebra and in model theory, a reduct of an algebraic structure is obtained by omitting some of the operations and relations of that structure. The opposite of "reduct" is "expansion".

== Definition ==
Let A be an algebraic structure (in the sense of universal algebra) or a structure in the sense of model theory, organized as a set X together with an indexed family of operations and relations φ_{i} on that set, with index set I. Then the reduct of A defined by a subset J of I is the structure consisting of the set X and J-indexed family of operations and relations whose j-th operation or relation for j ∈ J is the j-th operation or relation of A. That is, this reduct is the structure A with the omission of those operations and relations φ_{i} for which i is not in J.

A structure A is an expansion of B just when B is a reduct of A. That is, reduct and expansion are mutual converses.

== Examples ==
The monoid (Z, +, 0) of integers under addition is a reduct of the group (Z, +, −, 0) of integers under addition and negation, obtained by omitting negation. By contrast, the monoid (N, +, 0) of natural numbers under addition is not the reduct of any group.

Conversely the group (Z, +, −, 0) is the expansion of the monoid (Z, +, 0), expanding it with the operation of negation.
