= Logical constant =

Symbol with a fixed meaning in logic

In logic, a logical constant or constant symbol of a language $\mathcal{L}$ is a symbol that has the same semantic value under every interpretation of $\mathcal{L}$. Two important types of logical constants are logical connectives and quantifiers. The equality predicate (usually written '=') is also treated as a logical constant in many systems of logic.

One of the fundamental questions in the philosophy of logic is "What is a logical constant?"; that is, what special feature of certain constants makes them logical in nature?

Some symbols that are commonly treated as logical constants are:

Symbol	Meaning in English
T	"true"
F, ⊥	"false"
¬	"not"
∧	"and"
∨	"or"
→	"implies", "if...then"
∀	"for all"
∃	"there exists", "for some"
=	"equals"
$\Box$	"necessarily"
$\Diamond$	"possibly"

Many of these logical constants are sometimes denoted by alternative symbols (for instance, the use of the symbol "&" rather than "∧" to denote the logical and).

Defining logical constants is a major part of the work of Gottlob Frege and Bertrand Russell. Russell returned to the subject of logical constants in the preface to the second edition (1937) of The Principles of Mathematics noting that logic becomes linguistic: "If we are to say anything definite about them, [they] must be treated as part of the language, not as part of what the language speaks about." The text of this book uses relations R, their converses and complements as primitive notions, also taken as logical constants in the form aRb.

== See also ==
- Logical connective
- Logical value
- Non-logical symbol
