= Predicate (logic) =

Symbol representing a property or relation in logic

In logic, a predicate is a non-logical symbol that represents a property or a relation, though, formally, does not need to represent anything at all. For instance, in the first-order formula $P(a)$, the symbol $P$ is a predicate that applies to the individual constant $a$ which evaluates to either true or false. Similarly, in the formula $R(a,b)$, the symbol $R$ is a predicate that applies to the individual constants $a$ and $b$. Predicates are considered a primitive notion of first-order and higher-order logic, and are therefore not defined in terms of other more basic concepts.

The term derives from the grammatical term "predicate", meaning a word or phrase that represents a property or relation.

In the semantics of logic, predicates are interpreted as relations. For instance, in a standard semantics for first-order logic, the formula $R(a,b)$ would be true on an interpretation if the entities denoted by $a$ and $b$ stand in the relation denoted by $R$. Since predicates are non-logical symbols, they can denote different relations depending on the interpretation given to them. While first-order logic only includes predicates that apply to individual objects, other logics may allow predicates that apply to collections of objects defined by other predicates.

Strictly speaking, a predicate does not need to be given any interpretation, so long as its syntactic properties are well-defined. For example, equality may be understood solely through its reflexive and substitution properties (cf. Equality (mathematics) § Axioms). Other properties can be derived from these, and they are sufficient for proving theorems in mathematics. Similarly, set membership can be understood solely through the axioms of Zermelo–Fraenkel set theory.

== Predicates in different systems ==
A predicate is a statement or mathematical assertion that contains variables, sometimes referred to as predicate variables, and may be true or false depending on those variables’ value or values.

- In propositional logic, atomic formulas are sometimes regarded as zero-place predicates. In a sense, these are nullary (i.e. 0-arity) predicates.
- In first-order logic, a predicate is a non-logical relation symbol, which forms an atomic formula when applied to an appropriate number of terms.
- In set theory with the law of excluded middle, predicates are understood to be characteristic functions or set indicator functions (i.e., functions from a set element to a truth value). Set-builder notation makes use of predicates to define sets.
- In autoepistemic logic, which rejects the law of excluded middle, predicates may be true, false, or simply unknown. In particular, a given collection of facts may be insufficient to determine the truth or falsehood of a predicate.
- In fuzzy logic, the strict true/false valuation of the predicate is replaced by a quantity interpreted as the degree of truth.

== See also ==
- Free variables and bound variables
- Hypostatic abstraction
- Multigrade predicate
- Opaque predicate
- Philosophical predication
- Predicate functor logic
- Predicate variable
- Truthbearer
- Truth value
- Well-formed formula
