= List of logic symbols =

In logic, a set of symbols is commonly used to express logical representation. The following table lists many common symbols, together with their name, how they should be read out loud, and the related field of mathematics. In addition, the subsequent columns contain an informal explanation, a short example, the Unicode location, the name for use in HTML documents, and the LaTeX symbol.

== Propositional logic ==
Logical connectives
Logic Name	Symbol	Unicode value (hexadecimal)	HTML codes	LaTeX symbol	Read as	Explanation	Diagram
Negation	¬	U+00AC	&#172; &not;	$\neg$ \lnot or \neg	NOT	$\neg (\neg A) \Leftrightarrow A$	Negation
Negation	~	U+007E	&#732; &tilde;	$\sim$ \sim	NOT	$\neg (\neg A) \Leftrightarrow A$	Negation
Negation	!	U+0021	&excl;	$\neg$ \lnot or \neg	NOT	$\neg (\neg A) \Leftrightarrow A$	Negation
Negation	′	U+2032	&prime;	$'$ '	NOT	$\neg (\neg A) \Leftrightarrow A$	Negation
Conjunction	∧	U+2227	&#8743; &and;	$\wedge$ \wedge or \land	AND	$A \and B \Leftrightarrow \neg (\neg A \or \neg B)$	Conjunction
Conjunction	·	U+00B7	&#183; &middot;	$\cdot$ \cdot	AND	$A \and B \Leftrightarrow \neg (\neg A \or \neg B)$	Conjunction
Conjunction	&	U+0026	&#38; &amp;	$\&$ \&	AND	$A \and B \Leftrightarrow \neg (\neg A \or \neg B)$	Conjunction
Inclusive disjunction	∨	U+2228	&#8744; &or;	$\lor$ \lor or \vee	OR	$A \or B \Leftrightarrow \neg (\neg A \and \neg B)$	Inclusive disjunction
Inclusive disjunction	+	U+002B	&#43; &plus;		OR	$A \or B \Leftrightarrow \neg (\neg A \and \neg B)$	Inclusive disjunction
Inclusive disjunction	∥	U+2225	&#8741; &parallel;	$\parallel$ \parallel	OR	$A \or B \Leftrightarrow \neg (\neg A \and \neg B)$	Inclusive disjunction
Exclusive disjunction	⊕	U+2295	&#8853; &oplus;	$\oplus$ \oplus	XOR, either ... or ...	$A \veebar B \Leftrightarrow (A \or B) \and \neg(A \and B)$	Exclusive disjunction
Exclusive disjunction	⊻	U+22BB	&#8891; &veebar;	$\veebar$ \veebar	XOR, either ... or ...	$A \veebar B \Leftrightarrow (A \or B) \and \neg(A \and B)$	Exclusive disjunction
Exclusive disjunction	↮	U+21AE	&#8622;	$\not\leftrightarrow$ \nleftrightarrow	XOR, either ... or ...	$A \veebar B \Leftrightarrow (A \or B) \and \neg(A \and B)$	Exclusive disjunction
Exclusive disjunction	≢	U+2262	&#8802; &nequiv;	$\not\equiv$ \not\equiv	XOR, either ... or ...	$A \veebar B \Leftrightarrow (A \or B) \and \neg(A \and B)$	Exclusive disjunction
Non-conjunction (Sheffer stroke)	↑	U+2191		$\uparrow$ \uparrow	NAND, neither ... nor ...	$A \uparrow B \Leftrightarrow \neg(A \and B)$	Non-conjunction
Non-conjunction (Sheffer stroke)	|	U+007C		$\mid$ \vert, \mid	NAND, neither ... nor ...	$A \uparrow B \Leftrightarrow \neg(A \and B)$	Non-conjunction
Non-conjunction (Sheffer stroke)	⊼	U+22BC		$\barwedge$ \barwedge	NAND, neither ... nor ...	$A \uparrow B \Leftrightarrow \neg(A \and B)$	Non-conjunction
Non-disjunction	↓	U+2193		$\downarrow$ \downarrow	NOR	$A \downarrow B \Leftrightarrow \neg(A \or B)$	Non-disjunction
Non-disjunction	⊽	U+22BD		$\overline{\vee}$ \overline{\vee}	NOR	$A \downarrow B \Leftrightarrow \neg(A \or B)$	Non-disjunction
Conditional	⇒	U+21D2	&#8658; &rArr;	$\Rightarrow$ \Rightarrow $\implies$ \implies	Implies, then	$(A \Rightarrow B) \Leftrightarrow \neg (A \and \neg B)$	Conditional
Conditional	→	U+2192	&#8594; &rarr;	$\to$ \to or \rightarrow	Implies, then	$(A \Rightarrow B) \Leftrightarrow \neg (A \and \neg B)$	Conditional
Conditional	⊃	U+2283	&#8835; &sup;	$\supset$ \supset	Implies, then	$(A \Rightarrow B) \Leftrightarrow \neg (A \and \neg B)$	Conditional
Biconditional	⇔	U+21D4	&#8660; &hArr;	$\Leftrightarrow$ \Leftrightarrow $\iff$ \iff	If and only if, iff, XNOR	$(A \Leftrightarrow B) \Leftrightarrow (\neg A \and \neg B) \or (A \and B)$	Biconditional
Biconditional	↔	U+2194	&#8596; &harr;	$\leftrightarrow$ \leftrightarrow	If and only if, iff, XNOR	$(A \Leftrightarrow B) \Leftrightarrow (\neg A \and \neg B) \or (A \and B)$	Biconditional
Biconditional	≡	U+2261	&#8801; &equiv;	$\equiv$ \equiv	If and only if, iff, XNOR	$(A \Leftrightarrow B) \Leftrightarrow (\neg A \and \neg B) \or (A \and B)$	Biconditional
Biconditional	⊙	U+2299		$\odot$ \odot	If and only if, iff, XNOR	$(A \Leftrightarrow B) \Leftrightarrow (\neg A \and \neg B) \or (A \and B)$	Biconditional

Common propositional logic symbolsOther symbols
Logic Name	Symbol	Unicode value (hexadecimal)	HTML codes	LaTeX symbol	Read as	Category	Explanation	Examples
true (tautology)	⊤	U+22A4	&#8868; &top;	$\top$ \top	top, truth, tautology, verum, full clause	propositional logic, Boolean algebra, first-order logic	$\top$ denotes a proposition that is always true.	The proposition $\top \lor P$ is always true since at least one of the two is unconditionally true.
true (tautology)	T				top, truth, tautology, verum, full clause	propositional logic, Boolean algebra, first-order logic	$\top$ denotes a proposition that is always true.	The proposition $\top \lor P$ is always true since at least one of the two is unconditionally true.
true (tautology)	1				top, truth, tautology, verum, full clause	propositional logic, Boolean algebra, first-order logic	$\top$ denotes a proposition that is always true.	The proposition $\top \lor P$ is always true since at least one of the two is unconditionally true.
false (contradiction)	⊥	U+22A5	&#8869; &perp;	$\bot$ \bot	bottom, falsity, contradiction, falsum, empty clause	propositional logic, Boolean algebra, first-order logic	$\bot$ denotes a proposition that is always false. The symbol ⊥ may also refer to perpendicular lines.	The proposition $\bot \wedge P$ is always false since at least one of the two is unconditionally false.
false (contradiction)	F				bottom, falsity, contradiction, falsum, empty clause	propositional logic, Boolean algebra, first-order logic	$\bot$ denotes a proposition that is always false. The symbol ⊥ may also refer to perpendicular lines.	The proposition $\bot \wedge P$ is always false since at least one of the two is unconditionally false.
false (contradiction)	0				bottom, falsity, contradiction, falsum, empty clause	propositional logic, Boolean algebra, first-order logic	$\bot$ denotes a proposition that is always false. The symbol ⊥ may also refer to perpendicular lines.	The proposition $\bot \wedge P$ is always false since at least one of the two is unconditionally false.
precedence grouping	( )	U+0028 U+0029	&#40; &#41; &lpar; &rpar;	$(~)$ ( )	parentheses; brackets	almost all logic syntaxes, as well as metalanguage	Perform the operations inside the parentheses first.	(8 ÷ 4) ÷ 2 = 2 ÷ 2 = 1, but 8 ÷ (4 ÷ 2) = 8 ÷ 2 = 4.

=== Advanced or rarely used ===
Advanced or rarely used propositional symbols
Symbol	Unicode value (hexadecimal)	Logic Name
⌐	U+2310	reversed not sign
⨇	U+2A07	two logical AND operator

== First-order logic ==
Common first-order logic symbols
Symbol	Unicode value (hexadecimal)	HTML codes	LaTeX symbol	Logic Name	Read as	Category	Explanation	Examples
∀	U+2200	&#8704; &forall;	$\forall$ \forall	universal quantification	given any, for all, for every, for each, for any	first-order logic	$\forall x$ $P(x)$ or $(x)$ $P(x)$ says "given any $x$, $x$ has property $P$."	$\forall n \isin \mathbb{N}: n^2 \geq n.$
()				universal quantification	given any, for all, for every, for each, for any	first-order logic	$\forall x$ $P(x)$ or $(x)$ $P(x)$ says "given any $x$, $x$ has property $P$."	$\forall n \isin \mathbb{N}: n^2 \geq n.$
∃	U+2203	&#8707; &exist;	$\exists$ \exists	existential quantification	there exists, for some	first-order logic	$\exists x$ $P(x)$ says "there exists an $x$ (at least one) such that $x$ has property $P$."	$\exists n \isin \mathbb{N}:$ n is even.
∃!	U+2203 U+0021	&#8707; &#33; &exist;!	$\exists !$\exists !	uniqueness quantification	there exists exactly one	first-order logic (abbreviation)	$\exists! x$ $P ( x )$ says "there exists exactly one $x$ such that $x$ has property $P$." Only $\forall$ and $\exists$ are part of formal logic. $\exists! x$ $P ( x )$ is an abbreviation for $\exists x \forall y(P(y) \leftrightarrow y = x)$	$\exists! n \isin \mathbb{N}: n+5=2n.$

=== Advanced or rarely used first-order symbols ===
Advanced or rarely used first-order logic symbols
Symbol	Unicode value (hexadecimal)	HTML value (decimal)	HTML entity (named)	LaTeX symbol	Logic Name	Read as	Category	Explanation
∄	U+2204			\nexists	there does not exist			Strike out existential quantifier. "¬∃" is sometimes used instead.

== Metalanguage and metalogic ==
Common metalanguage and metalogic symbols
Symbol	Unicode value (hexadecimal)	HTML codes	LaTeX symbol	Logic Name	Read as	Category	Explanation	Examples
$\mathbb{D}$	U+1D53B	&#120123; &Dopf;	\mathbb{D}	domain of discourse	domain of discourse	metalanguage (first-order logic semantics)		$\mathbb D\mathbb :\mathbb R$
⊢	U+22A2	&#8866; &vdash;	$\vdash$ \vdash	syntactic consequence	proves, syntactically entails (single) turnstile	metalanguage (metalogic)	$A \vdash B$ says "$B$ is a theorem of $A$". In other words, $A$ proves $B$ via a deductive system.	$(A \rightarrow B) \vdash (\lnot B \rightarrow \lnot A)$ (eg. by using natural deduction)
⊨	U+22A8	&#8872; &vDash;	$\vDash$\vDash, \models	semantic consequence or satisfaction	(semantically) entails or satisfies, models double turnstile	metalanguage (metalogic)	$A \vDash B$ says "in every model, it is not the case that $A$ is true and $B$ is false". $\mathcal{M}, \sigma \vDash B$ says a formula $B$ is true in a model $\mathcal{M}$ with variable assignment $\sigma$.	$(A \rightarrow B) \vDash (\lnot B \rightarrow \lnot A)$ (eg. by using truth tables)
≡	U+2261	&equiv;	$\equiv$ \equiv	logical equivalence	is logically equivalent to	metalanguage (metalogic)	It's when $A \vDash B$ and $B \vDash A$. Whether a symbol means a material biconditional or a logical equivalence, depends on the author's style.	$(A \rightarrow B) \equiv (\lnot A \lor B)$
⟚	U+27DA			logical equivalence	is logically equivalent to	metalanguage (metalogic)	It's when $A \vDash B$ and $B \vDash A$. Whether a symbol means a material biconditional or a logical equivalence, depends on the author's style.	$(A \rightarrow B) \equiv (\lnot A \lor B)$
⇔	U+21D4	&#8660; &hArr;	$\Leftrightarrow$ \Leftrightarrow	logical equivalence	is logically equivalent to	metalanguage (metalogic)	It's when $A \vDash B$ and $B \vDash A$. Whether a symbol means a material biconditional or a logical equivalence, depends on the author's style.	$(A \rightarrow B) \equiv (\lnot A \lor B)$
⊬	U+22AC		⊬ \nvdash		does not syntactically entail (does not prove)	metalanguage (metalogic)	$A \nvdash B$ says "$B$ is not a theorem of $A$". In other words, $B$ is not derivable from $A$ via a deductive system.	$A \lor B \nvdash A \wedge B$
⊭	U+22AD		⊭\nvDash		does not semantically entail	metalanguage (metalogic)	$A \nvDash B$ says "$A$ does not guarantee the truth of $B$ ". In other words, $A$ does not make $B$ true.	$A \lor B \nvDash A \wedge B$
∴	U+2234		∴\therefore	therefore	therefore	metalanguage	abbreviation for "therefore"	
∵	U+2235		∵ \because	because	because	metalanguage	abbreviation for "because".	
≔	U+2254	&#8788; &coloneq;	≔ \coloneqq $:=$ :=	definition	is defined as	metalanguage	$a:=b$ means "from now on, $a$ is defined to be another name for $b$." This is a statement in the metalanguage, not the object language. The notation $a \equiv b$ may occasionally be seen in physics, meaning the same as $a:=b$.	$\cosh x := \frac {e^x + e^{-x}} {2}$
≜	U+225C		$\triangleq$ \triangleq	definition	is defined as	metalanguage	$a:=b$ means "from now on, $a$ is defined to be another name for $b$." This is a statement in the metalanguage, not the object language. The notation $a \equiv b$ may occasionally be seen in physics, meaning the same as $a:=b$.	$\cosh x := \frac {e^x + e^{-x}} {2}$
≝	U+225D		$\stackrel{\scriptscriptstyle \mathrm{def}}{=}$ \stackrel{ \scriptscriptstyle \mathrm{def}}{=}	definition	is defined as	metalanguage	$a:=b$ means "from now on, $a$ is defined to be another name for $b$." This is a statement in the metalanguage, not the object language. The notation $a \equiv b$ may occasionally be seen in physics, meaning the same as $a:=b$.	$\cosh x := \frac {e^x + e^{-x}} {2}$

=== Advanced or rarely used metalogical symbols ===
Advanced or rarely used metalogical symbols
Symbol	Unicode value (hexadecimal)	LaTeX symbol	Logic Name	Explanation
̅	U+0305	\overline{x}	combining overline	Used format for denoting Gödel numbers. Using HTML style "4̅" is an abbreviation for the standard numeral "SSSS0". It may also denote a negation (used primarily in electronics).
⌜ ⌝	U+231C; U+231D	\ulcorner \urcorner	top left corner top right corner	Corner quotes, also called "Quine quotes"; for quasi-quotation, i.e. quoting a specific context of unspecified ("variable") expressions; also used for denoting Gödel number; for example "⌜G⌝" denotes the Gödel number of G. (Typographical note: although the quotes appears as a "pair" in unicode (231C and 231D), they are not symmetrical in some fonts. In some fonts (for example Arial) they are only symmetrical in certain sizes. Alternatively the quotes can be rendered as ⌈ and ⌉ (U+2308 and U+2309) or by using a negation symbol and a reversed negation symbol ⌐ ¬ in superscript mode.)
⟛	U+27DB		left and right tack	"Proves and is proved by".
⊩	U+22A9	\Vdash	forces	One of this symbol's uses is to mean "truthmakes" in the truthmaker theory of truth. It is also used to mean "forces" in the set theory method of forcing.
⋆	U+22C6	\star	star operator	May sometimes be used for ad-hoc operators.

== Modal logic ==
Common modal logic symbols
Symbol	Unicode value (hexadecimal)	HTML codes	LaTeX symbol	Logic Name	Read as	Category	Explanation	Examples
□	U+25A1		$\Box$\Box	necessity (in a model)	box; it is necessary that	modal logic	modal operator for "it is necessary that" in alethic logic, "it is provable that" in provability logic, "it is obligatory that" in deontic logic, "it is believed that" in doxastic logic, "it is known that" in autoepistemic logic.	$\Box \forall x P(x)$ says "it is necessary that everything has property $P$"
◇	U+25C7		$\Diamond$ \Diamond	possibility (in a model)	diamond; it is possible that	modal logic	modal operator for "it is possible that", (in most modal logics it is defined as "¬□¬", "it is not necessarily not").	$\Diamond \exists x P(x)$ says "it is possible that something has property $P$"

=== Advanced or rarely used modal symbols ===
Advanced or rarely used modal logic symbols
Symbol	Unicode value (hexadecimal)	HTML value (decimal)	HTML entity (named)	LaTeX symbol	Logic Name	Read as	Category	Explanation
⥽	U+297D			\strictif	right fish tail			Sometimes used for "relation", also used for denoting various ad hoc relations (for example, for denoting "witnessing" in the context of Rosser's trick). The fish tail is also used as strict implication by C.I.Lewis $p$ ⥽ $q \equiv \Box(p\rightarrow q)$.
⟡	U+27E1				white concave-sided diamond	never	modal operator	
⟢	U+27E2				white concave-sided diamond with leftwards tick	was never	modal operator	
⟣	U+27E3				white concave-sided diamond with rightwards tick	will never be	modal operator	
⟤	U+25A4				white square with leftwards tick	was always	modal operator	
⟥	U+25A5				white square with rightwards tick	will always be	modal operator	

== See also ==
- Glossary of logic
- Józef Maria Bocheński
- List of notation used in Principia Mathematica
- List of mathematical symbols
- Logic alphabet, a suggested set of logical symbols
- Logic gate § Symbols
- Logical connective
- Mathematical operators and symbols in Unicode
- Non-logical symbol
- Polish notation
- Truth function
- Truth table
- Wikipedia:WikiProject Logic/Standards for notation
