= Tee (symbol) =

Typographical symbol resembling a "T"

The tee (⊤, \top in LaTeX), also called down tack (as opposed to the up tack) or verum, is a symbol used to represent:

- The truth value of being true in logic, or a sentence (e.g., formula in propositional calculus) which is unconditionally true. By definition, every tautology is logically equivalent to the verum.
- The top type in type theory.
- The top element in lattice theory.
- Mixed radix encoding in the APL programming language.
- A lowered phonic in the International Phonetic Alphabet and phonetics. In this usage, it is usually written under the primary IPA symbol.

A similar-looking superscript T may be used to mean the transpose of a matrix.

== Encoding ==
In Unicode, the tee character is encoded as U+22A4 ⊤ DOWN TACK (&DownTee;, &top;). The symbol is encoded in LaTeX as \top.

A large variant is encoded as U+27D9 ⟙ LARGE DOWN TACK in the Unicode block Miscellaneous Mathematical Symbols-A.

== See also ==
- Turnstile (⊢)
- Up tack (⊥)
- List of logic symbols
- List of mathematical symbols
