= Logical equivalent =

Logical equivalent may refer to:

- Logical equivalence, in logic and mathematics
- Logical equality, the logical operator in propositional calculus
- XNOR gate, a logic gate implementing logical equality
