= Logical Garnet =

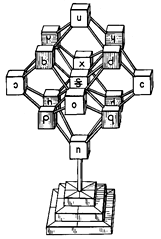
Logical Garnet

The Logical Garnet is the name Shea Zellweger gave to a labelled rhombic dodecahedron where Zellweger's Logic Alphabet is used to provide icons illustrative of his categorisation of the sixteen binary boolean connectives distributed to the 14 vertices of the geometric figure, with a fifteenth location depicting the Exclusive or and its negation, the logical biconditional. Zellweger described the Logic Alphabet as being like a "two-dimensional presentation of a higher-dimensional figure". He then states that the rhombic dodecahedron is a three-dimensional version of this figure, which he calls the Logical Garnet. He regarded it as similar to a garnet gemstone.
