= Miscellaneous Mathematical Symbols-A =

- Range: U+27C0..U+27EF (48 code points)
- Plane: BMP
- Scripts: Common
- Symbol sets: Mathematical notation Logical notation
- Assigned: 48 code points
- Unused: 0 reserved code points

Unicode version history
- 3.2 (2002): 28 (+28)
- 4.1 (2005): 35 (+7)
- 5.0 (2006): 39 (+4)
- 5.1 (2008): 44 (+5)
- 6.0 (2010): 46 (+2)
- 6.1 (2012): 48 (+2)

Unicode documentation
- Code chart ∣ Web page

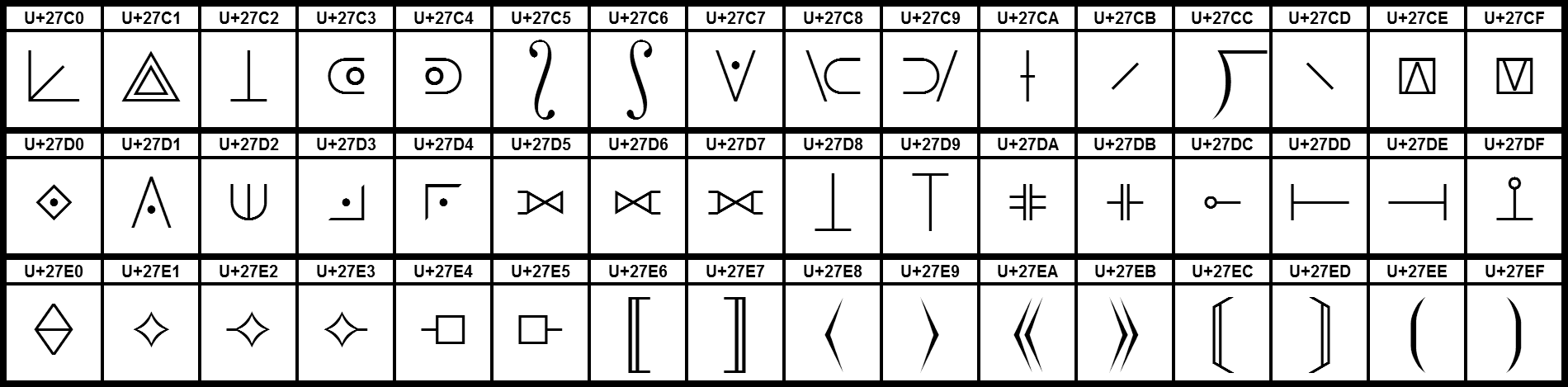
Graphical representation of the Miscellaneous Mathematical Symbols-A Unicode block

Miscellaneous Mathematical Symbols-A is a Unicode block containing characters for mathematical, logical, and database notation.

== Character table ==
Code	Result	Description
U+27C0	⟀	Three dimensional angle
U+27C1	⟁	White triangle containing small white triangle
U+27C2	⟂	Perpendicular
U+27C3	⟃	Open subset
U+27C4	⟄	Open superset
U+27C5	⟅	Left S-shaped bag delimiter
U+27C6	⟆	Right S-shaped bag delimiter
U+27C7	⟇	Or with dot inside
U+27C8	⟈	Reverse solidus preceding subset
U+27C9	⟉	Superset preceding solidus
U+27CA	⟊	Vertical bar with horizontal stroke
U+27CB	⟋	Mathematical rising diagonal
U+27CC	⟌	Long division
U+27CD	⟍	Mathematical falling diagonal
U+27CE	⟎	Squared logical and
U+27CF	⟏	Squared logical or
U+27D0	⟐	White diamond with centered dot
U+27D1	⟑	And with dot
U+27D2	⟒	Element of opening upward
U+27D3	⟓	Lower right corner with dot
U+27D4	⟔	Upper left corner with dot
U+27D5	⟕	Left outer join
U+27D6	⟖	Right outer join
U+27D7	⟗	Full outer join
U+27D8	⟘	Large up tack
U+27D9	⟙	Large down tack
U+27DA	⟚	Left and right double turnstile
U+27DB	⟛	Left and right tack
U+27DC	⟜	Left multimap
U+27DD	⟝	Long right tack
U+27DE	⟞	Long left tack
U+27DF	⟟	Up tack with circle above
U+27E0	⟠	Lozenge divided by horizontal rule
U+27E1	⟡	White concave-sided diamond
U+27E2	⟢	White concave-sided diamond with leftward tick
U+27E3	⟣	White concave-sided diamond with rightward tick
U+27E4	⟤	White square with leftward tick
U+27E5	⟥	White square with rightward tick
U+27E6	⟦	Mathematical left white square bracket
U+27E7	⟧	Mathematical right white square bracket
U+27E8	⟨	Mathematical left angle bracket
U+27E9	⟩	Mathematical right angle bracket
U+27EA	⟪	Mathematical left double angle bracket
U+27EB	⟫	Mathematical right double angle bracket
U+27EC	⟬	Mathematical left white tortoise shell bracket
U+27ED	⟭	Mathematical right white tortoise shell bracket
U+27EE	⟮	Mathematical left flattened parenthesis
U+27EF	⟯	Mathematical right flattened parenthesis

== Compact table ==
Miscellaneous Mathematical Symbols-A^{[1]} Official Unicode Consortium code chart (PDF)
	0	1	2	3	4	5	6	7	8	9	A	B	C	D	E	F
U+27Cx	⟀	⟁	⟂	⟃	⟄	⟅	⟆	⟇	⟈	⟉	⟊	⟋	⟌	⟍	⟎	⟏
U+27Dx	⟐	⟑	⟒	⟓	⟔	⟕	⟖	⟗	⟘	⟙	⟚	⟛	⟜	⟝	⟞	⟟
U+27Ex	⟠	⟡	⟢	⟣	⟤	⟥	⟦	⟧	⟨	⟩	⟪	⟫	⟬	⟭	⟮	⟯
Notes 1.As of Unicode version 17.0

== History ==
The following Unicode-related documents record the purpose and process of defining specific characters in the Miscellaneous Mathematical Symbols-A block:

Version	Final code points (Note: Proposed code points and characters names may differ from final code points and names)	Count	L2 ID	WG2 ID	Document
3.2	U+27D0..27E5	22	L2/01-142 (Note: Refer to the history section of the Miscellaneous Mathematical Symbols-B block for additional math-related documents)	N2336	Beeton, Barbara; Freytag, Asmus; Ion, Patrick (2001-04-02), Additional Mathematical Symbols
3.2	U+27D0..27E5	22	L2/01-227		Whistler, Ken (2001-05-22), "ITEM 3", WG2 Consent Docket for UTC #87
3.2	U+27D0..27E5	22	L2/01-184R		Moore, Lisa (2001-06-18), "Motion 87-M16, ITEM 3", Minutes from the UTC/L2 meeting
3.2	U+27D0..27E5	22	L2/01-344	N2353 (pdf, doc)	Umamaheswaran, V. S. (2001-09-09), "Resolution M40.4", Minutes from SC2/WG2 meeting #40 -- Mountain View, April 2001
3.2	U+27E6..27EB	6	L2/99-052		Freytag, Asmus (1999-02-05), The math pieces from the symbol font
3.2	U+27E6..27EB	6	L2/01-033		Karlsson, Kent; Freytag, Asmus (2001-01-16), Disunify braces/brackets for math, computing science, and Z notation from similar-looking CJK braces/brackets
3.2	U+27E6..27EB	6	L2/01-159	N2344	Ad-hoc report on Mathematical Symbols, 2001-04-03
3.2	U+27E6..27EB	6	L2/01-157	N2345R	Karlsson, Kent (2001-04-04), Proposal to disunify certain fencing CJK punctuation marks from similar-looking Math fences
3.2	U+27E6..27EB	6	L2/01-168		Whistler, Ken (2001-04-10), Bracket Disunification & Normalization Hell
3.2	U+27E6..27EB	6	L2/01-012R		Moore, Lisa (2001-05-21), "Disunifying Braces and Brackets", Minutes UTC #86 in Mountain View, Jan 2001
3.2	U+27E6..27EB	6	L2/01-223		Suignard, Michel (2001-05-23), Discussion of Issues Regarding Bracket Disunification
3.2	U+27E6..27EB	6	L2/01-184R		Moore, Lisa (2001-06-18), "Motion 87-M21", Minutes from the UTC/L2 meeting, "Reverse the decision made in motion 86-M6 not to disunify brackets."
3.2	U+27E6..27EB	6	L2/01-317		Suignard, Michel (2001-08-14), Bracket Disunification & Normalization
3.2	U+27E6..27EB	6	L2/01-295R		Moore, Lisa (2001-11-06), "Bracket Disunification and Normalization", Minutes from the UTC/L2 meeting #88
3.2	U+27E6..27EB	6	L2/02-154	N2403	Umamaheswaran, V. S. (2002-04-22), "Resolution M41.1", Draft minutes of WG 2 meeting 41, Hotel Phoenix, Singapore, 2001-10-15/19
4.1	U+27C0..27C1	2	L2/03-187	N2612-6	Pantelia, Maria (2003-06-11), Proposal to encode ancient Greek mathematical characters in the UCS
4.1	U+27C2	1	L2/03-194	N2590	Freytag, Asmus (2003-06-09), Additional Mathematical and Letterlike Characters
4.1	U+27C3..27C6	4	L2/03-410	N2680R	Freytag, Asmus (2003-10-30), Additional Mathematical Characters
4.1	U+27C3..27C6	4	L2/04-098		Suignard, Michel (2004-02-04), "T.10 Miscellaneous Mathematical, item b", Comments accompanying the US positive vote on PDAM1 to ISO/IEC 10646:2003
4.1	U+27C3..27C6	4	L2/04-316		Moore, Lisa (2004-08-19), "100-C6", UTC #100 Minutes
5.0	U+27C7..27C9	3	L2/04-406		Freytag, Asmus; Sargent, Murray; Beeton, Barbara; Carlisle, David (2004-11-15), Progress report on Mathematical Symbols
5.0	U+27C7..27C9	3	L2/04-410		Freytag, Asmus (2004-11-18), Twenty six mathematical characters
5.0	U+27CA	1	L2/05-189	N2958	Lehtiranta, Juhani; Ruppel, Klaas; Suutari, Toni; Trosterud, Trond (2005-07-22), Report on progress in implementing the Uralic Phonetic Alphabet with indication of the need for additional characters and symbols
5.0	U+27CA	1	L2/05-261	N2989	Ruppel, Klaas; Kolehmainen, Erkki I.; Everson, Michael; Freytag, Asmus; Whistler, Ken (2005-09-13), Proposal to add six additional Uralicist characters to the UCS
5.0	U+27CA	1	L2/05-270		Whistler, Ken (2005-09-21), "A. Uralicist character additions", WG2 Consent Docket (Sophia Antipolis)
5.0	U+27CA	1	L2/05-279		Moore, Lisa (2005-11-10), "Consensus 105-C29", UTC #105 Minutes
5.0	U+27CA	1		N2953 (pdf, doc)	Umamaheswaran, V. S. (2006-02-16), "7.4.7", Unconfirmed minutes of WG 2 meeting 47, Sophia Antipolis, France; 2005-09-12/15
5.1	U+27CC, 27EE..27EF	3	L2/07-011R	N3198R	Freytag, Asmus; Beeton, Barbara; Ion, Patrick; Sargent, Murray; Carlisle, David; Pournader, Roozbeh (2007-01-15), 29 Additional Mathematical and Symbol Characters
5.1	U+27CC, 27EE..27EF	3	L2/07-015		Moore, Lisa (2007-02-08), "Mathematical Characters and Symbols (C.4)", UTC #110 Minutes
5.1	U+27CC, 27EE..27EF	3	L2/07-268	N3253 (pdf, doc)	Umamaheswaran, V. S. (2007-07-26), "M50.16", Unconfirmed minutes of WG 2 meeting 50, Frankfurt-am-Main, Germany; 2007-04-24/27
5.1	U+27EC..27ED	2	L2/06-054R	N3040	Freytag, Asmus; Beeton, Barbara; Sargent, Murray (2006-02-09), Proposal for the Addition of Two Mathematical Bracket Characters
5.1	U+27EC..27ED	2	L2/06-008R2		Moore, Lisa (2006-02-13), "C.21", UTC #106 Minutes
5.1	U+27EC..27ED	2		N3103 (pdf, doc)	Umamaheswaran, V. S. (2006-08-25), "M48.22", Unconfirmed minutes of WG 2 meeting 48, Mountain View, CA, USA; 2006-04-24/27
6.0	U+27CE..27CF	2	L2/09-273	N3677	Iancu, Laurențiu (2009-07-28), Proposal to Encode Two Mathematical Symbols
6.0	U+27CE..27CF	2	L2/09-225R		Moore, Lisa (2009-08-17), "D.2.2", UTC #120 / L2 #217 Minutes
6.0	U+27CE..27CF	2	L2/09-359		Iancu, Laurențiu (2009-10-21), Follow-up on Action Item 120-A77
6.0	U+27CE..27CF	2		N3703 (pdf, doc)	Umamaheswaran, V. S. (2010-04-13), "M55.9b", Unconfirmed minutes of WG 2 meeting no. 55, Tokyo 2009-10-26/30
6.1	U+27CB, 27CD	2	L2/09-397		Iancu, Laurențiu (2009-10-26), Proposal to Encode Mathematical Diagonals
6.1	U+27CB, 27CD	2	L2/09-335R		Moore, Lisa (2009-11-10), "D.2.1", UTC #121 / L2 #218 Minutes
6.1	U+27CB, 27CD	2	L2/10-007R	N3763	Anderson, Deborah; Beeton, Barbara; Iancu, Laurențiu (2010-01-12), Revised Proposal to Encode Mathematical Diagonals
6.1	U+27CB, 27CD	2	L2/10-010		Constable, Peter; Iancu, Laurențiu; Sargent, Murray (2010-01-13), Proposal to rename the diagonal symbols U+27CB and U+27CD in the pipeline
6.1	U+27CB, 27CD	2	L2/10-015R		Moore, Lisa (2010-02-09), "Consensus 122-C11", UTC #122 / L2 #219 Minutes, "Change the name of U+27CB from RISING DIAGONAL to MATHEMATICAL RISING DIAGONAL and U+27CD from FALLING DIAGONAL to MATHEMATICAL FALLING DIAGONAL."
6.1	U+27CB, 27CD	2		N3803 (pdf, doc)	"M56.08c", Unconfirmed minutes of WG 2 meeting no. 56, 2010-09-24

== See also ==
- Mathematical operators and symbols in Unicode
