= Tautological consequence =

Concept in propositional logic

In propositional logic, tautological consequence is a strict form of logical consequence in which the tautologousness of a proposition is preserved from one line of a proof to the next. Not all logical consequences are tautological consequences. A proposition $Q$ is said to be a tautological consequence of one or more other propositions ($P_1$, $P_2$, ..., $P_n$) in a proof with respect to some logical system if one is validly able to introduce the proposition onto a line of the proof within the rules of the system; and in all cases when each of ($P_1$, $P_2$, ..., $P_n$) are true, the proposition $Q$ also is true.

Another way to express this preservation of tautologousness is by using truth tables. A proposition $Q$ is said to be a tautological consequence of one or more other propositions ($P_1$, $P_2$, ..., $P_n$) if and only if in every row of a joint truth table that assigns "T" to all propositions ($P_1$, $P_2$, ..., $P_n$) the truth table also assigns "T" to $Q$.

== Example ==
a = "Socrates is a man." b = "All men are mortal." c = "Socrates is mortal."

a
b
$${\therefore c}$$

The conclusion of this argument is a logical consequence of the premises because it is impossible for all the premises to be true while the conclusion false.

Joint Truth Table for a ∧ b and c
a	b	c	a ∧ b	c
T	T	T	T	T
T	T	F	T	F
T	F	T	F	T
T	F	F	F	F
F	T	T	F	T
F	T	F	F	F
F	F	T	F	T
F	F	F	F	F

Reviewing the truth table, it turns out the conclusion of the argument is not a tautological consequence of the premise. Not every row that assigns T to the premise also assigns T to the conclusion. In particular, it is the second row that assigns T to a ∧ b, but does not assign T to c.

== Denotation and properties ==
Tautological consequence can also be defined as $P_1$ ∧ $P_2$ ∧ ... ∧ $P_n$ → $Q$ is a substitution instance of a tautology, with the same effect.

It follows from the definition that if a proposition p is a contradiction then p tautologically implies every proposition, because there is no truth valuation that causes p to be true and so the definition of tautological implication is trivially satisfied. Similarly, if p is a tautology then p is tautologically implied by every proposition.

== See also ==
- Logical consequence
- Tautology (logic)
- Truth table
