= Shea Zellweger =

American semiotician (1925–2022)

Shea Zellweger (September 7, 1925 – August 7, 2022) was an American semiotician who served as Chair of the Psychology Department at the University of Mount Union from 1969 to 1992. Zellweger’s lifetime achievements and academic contributions to education continue to be significant. Zellweger created a simple and mentally intuitive system of logic notation called the Logic Alphabet. The Logic Alphabet, also known as the X-stem Logic Alphabet (XLA), is a notation system that contains a unique and visually iconographic approach to learning and performing logic operations. He also developed the Logical Garnet as a way of expressing these relationships as rhombic dodecahedron. Patents have been issued on its design in the United States, Canada and Japan.

== Personal life and death ==
Zellweger was born in Chicago, Illinois, on September 7, 1925. He received his Ph.D. in Experimental Psychology at Temple University in 1966. His doctoral dissertation focused on early visual stimulation experience and its later effects on discrimination learning.

Zellweger died in Alliance, Ohio, on August 7, 2022, at the age of 96.

== Background ==
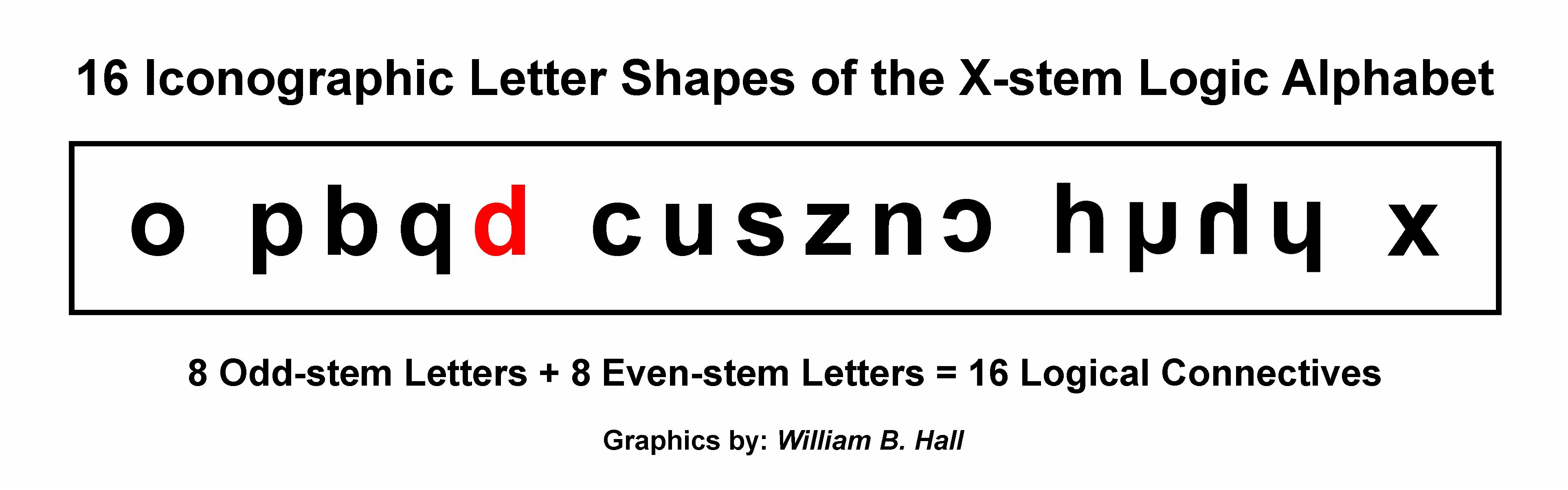
Zellweger's X-stem Logic Alphabet (XLA) shape value notation for the 16 binary logical connectives. The count of the iconographic letter shapes, 8 odd-stem (– 4 – 4 –) and 8 even-stem (1 – 6 – 1), corresponds to the fifth row of Pascal's Triangle (1 4 6 4 1). (Click Image to Enlarge)

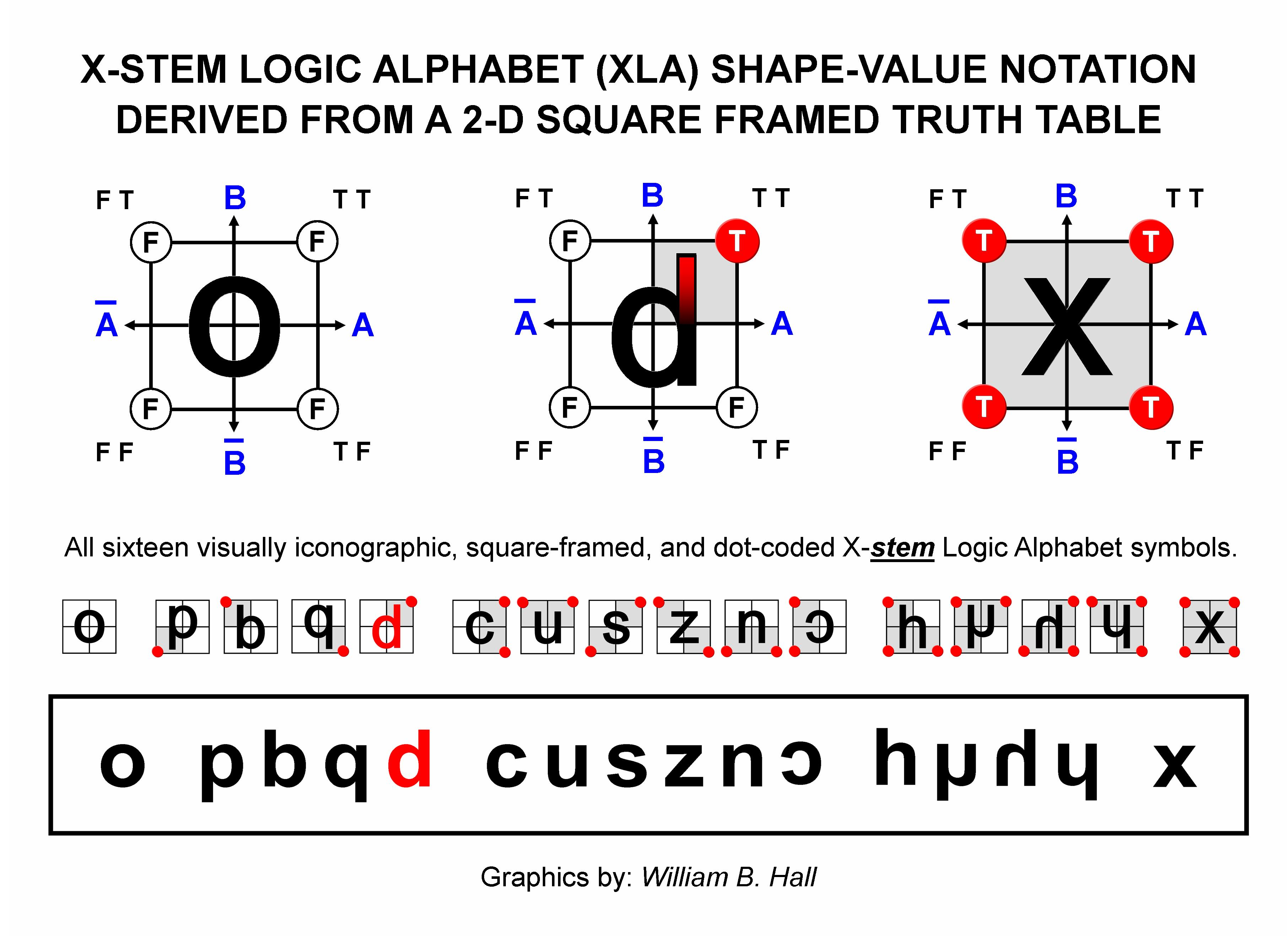
Zellweger's XLA shape value notation derived from a 2-dimensional square-framed truth table. (Click Image to Enlarge)

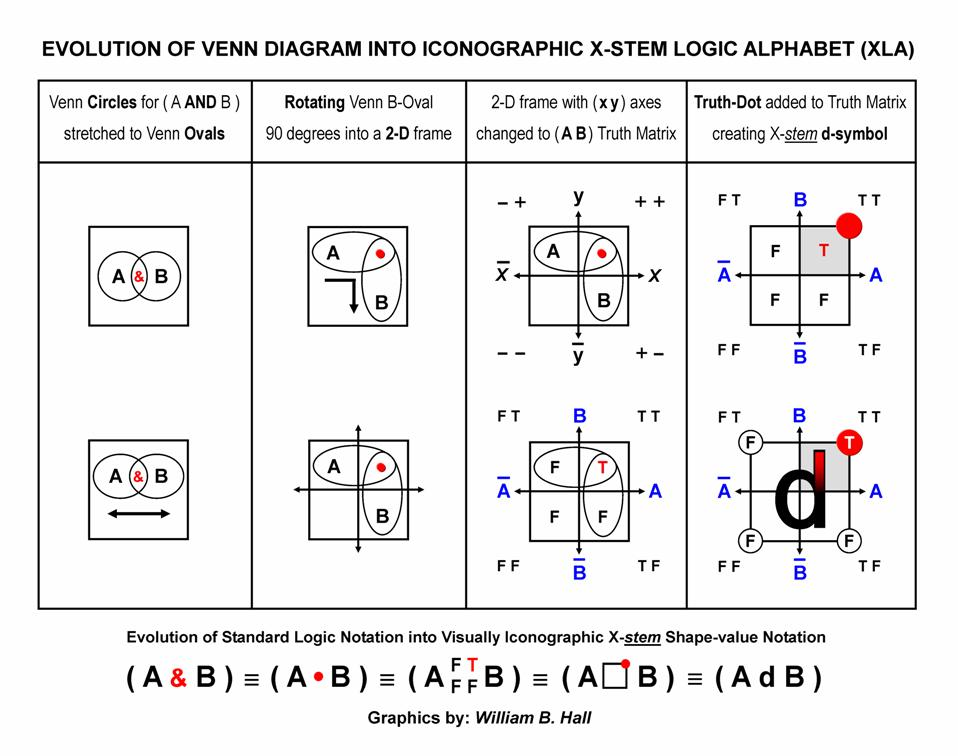
Zellweger's evolution of a Venn Diagram into a four quadrant truth matrix. (Click Image to Enlarge)

Zellweger’s background is a combination of formal education and extensive research in the fields of Psychology, Pedagogy, Semiotics and Logic. In 1949, Zellweger attended a summer seminar at the Institute of General Semantics with Alfred Korzybski. In 1949–52, still in the era of Robert M. Hutchins and the Great Books Program, he earned his undergraduate degree at the University of Chicago. In 1975–76, he spent a year at the Biological Computer Laboratory, University of Illinois at Urbana-Champaign, under the direction of Heinz von Foerster. In 1982, while on sabbatical leave at the Peirce Edition Project, in Indianapolis (IUPUI), he examined and carefully reordered a 900 page section of manuscripts written by Charles Sanders Peirce entitled “The Simplest Mathematics” (1902). In 1989, he served the Peirce Edition Project again when he added to the proper sequencing of specific sections of Peirce’s extensive manuscripts. These multidisciplinary experiences contributed to the development, over a forty-year period, of his X-stem Logic Alphabet. Zellweger has been a respected academic speaker and author, especially in the fields of Semiotics and Education.

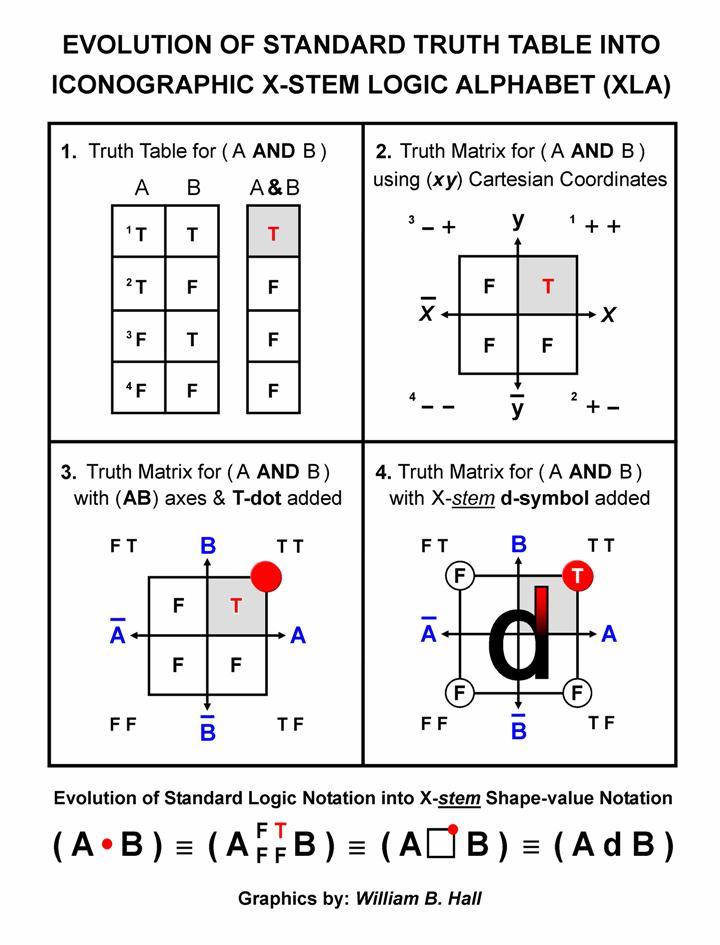
Zellweger's evolution of a logic truth table into a four quadrant truth matrix. (Click Image to Enlarge)

== Publications ==
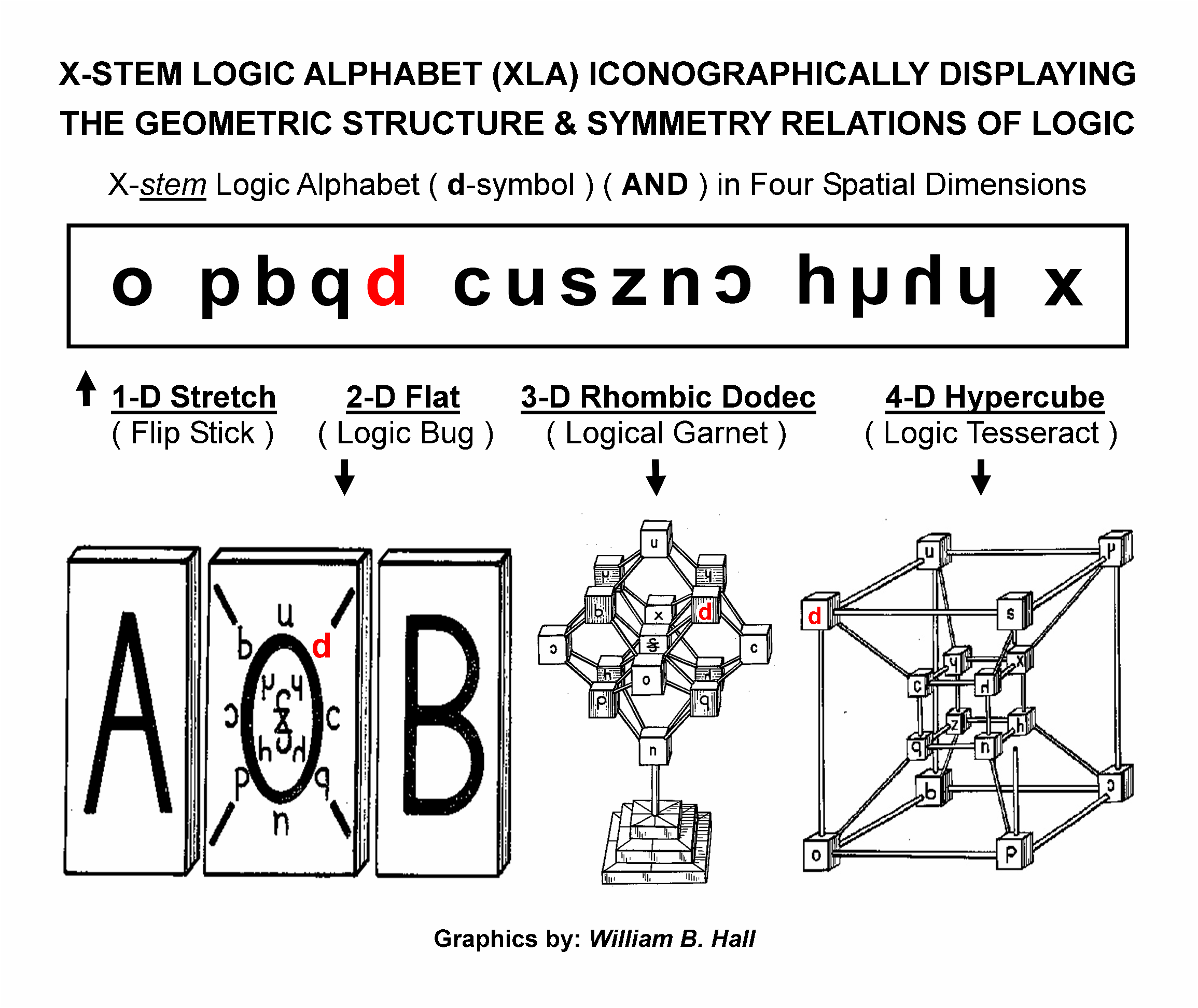
Geometric structures and symmetry relations revealed by XLA in one to four spatial dimensions. (Click Image to Enlarge)

Zellweger’s publications, as well as his unpublished materials, are extensive. A general principle expressed throughout his writings is the need for conscious and deliberate efforts that focus on the sign design and sign engineering of any and all kinds of notation (e.g. natural language and its specialized systems of logical, mathematical, chemical and musical notation). Moreover, his publications primarily center on the formal language of logic and improving the structure of its symbols. Specifically, he focuses on the deliberate engineering of a constructed language for logic called the X-stem Logic Alphabet (XLA). He emphasizes, with the mounting global prevalence of computers or “logic machines”, the importance of adopting a higher standard for the way we write and communicate logic. He brings to light the importance of a carefully constructed user-friendly notation that would allow students, at earlier stages of cognitive development, to learn and incorporate the fundamental skills of logic. He further highlights the importance of purposely designing our symbols of notation to be as cognitively ergonomic as possible, while simultaneously possessing multiple layers of rich content. The fundamental and applied principles of semiotic engineering are exemplified throughout his publications.

== Contribution ==
Zellweger’s contribution to the field of logic is best demonstrated through his development of the X-stem Logic Alphabet (XLA). The XLA notation is a highly advanced extension of both Charles Sanders Peirce’s box-X notation (1902) and Warren Sturgis McCulloch’s dot-X notation (1942). It could be said that XLA (1961–62) is the evolutionary product of the comprehensive work of Peirce, McCulloch, and Zellweger, or PMZ as an acronym. The standard notation used today (dot Logical conjunction, vee Logical disjunction, horseshoe Material conditional representing and, or, if) is a lingering, overly abstract, unsystematically selected set of symbols that was primarily developed and used by Peano, Whitehead, and Russell, or by common acronym PWR. This already exposes the primary weakness. Dot, vee, horseshoe do not carry any information that identifies, specifies, and encodes the truth tables they represent, namely, TFFF, TTTF, and TFTT. In marked contrast, XLA is an intentionally engineered set of sixteen iconographic letter shape symbols specifically designed to improve the efficiency of learning and performing logical operations. Serving as a system of highly abbreviated mini truth tables, Zellweger’s claim is that XLA is not only much easier to learn. It is also much easier to use. In fact, when ten-base numerals are used without the abacus and when XLA is used without written laid out rows and columns of truth tables, ordinary operations in both notations are easier to perform during the act of computational writing.

It can be said that the current PWR symbols are to logic what Roman Numerals are to arithmetic. Roman Numerals (I, II, III) were cumbersome to use and only maintained a dominant role in arithmetic until 1202, when Leonardo Fibonacci in his work Liber Abaci, demonstrated that calculations with Hindu-Arabic numerals (1, 2, 3) were far more efficient. The lack of mental and written efficiency in the use of traditional PWR symbols may be because they are not icons. Therefore, these extremely abstract symbols cannot in writing visually depict the truth tables themselves, the simple geometric forms, the notational symmetry relations, and the isomorphic sets of interrelations inherent in logic. Conversely, the XLA symbols are iconographic and they possess a shape value. This enables complex logical operations to be performed through easy flips and rotations of the letter shape symbols themselves.

By design, the letter shape of each X-stem Logic Alphabet symbol visually embodies and displays its individual underlying logic truth table. In other words, after the simple and exact truth table code in the deep structure of XLA has been learned, operations performed on the letter shape symbols are equivalent to logical operations acting on highly abbreviated sets of mini truth tables. Consequently, those using XLA never have the need to interrupt their calculations to check rows and columns of laid out truth tables. This basic and central advantage of XLA over PWR is often not fully recognized, even by practiced logicians. Nonetheless, systems of notation evolve and improve over time (e.g. Roman Numerals to the Decimal System and Imperial Units to the Metric System).

In brief, XLA is described in two steps: (1) give the 16 binary connectives the right geometry, the right shape value anatomy; and (2) add the transformational physiology, namely, apply the algebra of simple symmetry groups to the 16 iconic letter shape symbols. Change comes with a whisper. This whisper presents a triple isomorphism. The mental operations are the same as the symmetry operations are the same as the logical operations. Said the other way around, the logical operations are the same as the symmetry operations are the same as the mental operations. Said again in a different order, the logical operations are the same as the mental operations are the same as the symmetry operations. Here we have a prime example of cognitive ergonomics at its best. The single act of performing any one automatically performs the other two.

Whether or not the (PMZ) (XLA) system, or something similar to it, replaces the traditional PWR symbols remains to be seen. Nonetheless, for researchers and semioticians, Zellweger's contributions to logic notation will most likely play a valuable role in future developments.

== Teaching ==
Zellweger’s teaching system, for logic, integrates the developmental and interactive approaches of Fröbel, Montessori, and Piaget. This is accomplished through the use of educational tools and models that predominantly focus on visual and kinesthetic learning modalities. At every level in the educational ladder, students of Zellweger’s system learn in a natural and intuitive way through the use of sensory-motor exercises and a variety of interactive geometric models. (See video of Zellweger’s teaching models at the Museum of Jurassic Technology:) These models, at the most advanced level, become extremely complex and beautiful.

Each X-stem Logic Alphabet symbol can be easily flipped or rotated, by eye-hand coordination, through a series of simple symmetry transformations. When a student can visually and manually observe the geometry and the network of symmetry relationships among all 16 binary connectives of two-valued logic, it then becomes far easier for them to perform what are normally considered to be highly abstract logical operations. Zellweger’s publications and models permit students to literally “see”, “touch”, “play with”, “work with”, and “think about” the natural beauty of logic. His work is now on display at the Museum of Jurassic Technology, Culver City, California. (See Flickr image: )
