= Logic alphabet =

Symbols representing logical operations

The logic alphabet, also called the X-stem Logic Alphabet (XLA), constitutes an iconic set of symbols that systematically represents the sixteen possible binary truth functions of logic. The logic alphabet was developed by Shea Zellweger. The major emphasis of his iconic "logic alphabet" is to provide a more cognitively ergonomic notation for logic. Zellweger's visually iconic system more readily reveals, to the novice and expert alike, the underlying symmetry relationships and geometric properties of the sixteen binary connectives within Boolean algebra.

== Truth functions ==
Truth functions are functions from sequences of truth values to truth values. A unary truth function, for example, takes a single truth value and maps it to another truth value. Similarly, a binary truth function maps ordered pairs of truth values to truth values, while a ternary truth function maps ordered triples of truth values to truth values, and so on.

In the unary case, there are two possible inputs, viz. T and F, and thus four possible unary truth functions: one mapping T to T and F to F, one mapping T to F and F to F, one mapping T to T and F to T, and finally one mapping T to F and F to T, this last one corresponding to the familiar operation of logical negation. In the form of a table, the four unary truth functions may be represented as follows.

Unary truth functions
| p | p | F | T | ~p |
|---|---|---|---|---|
| T | T | F | T | F |
| F | F | F | T | T |

In the binary case, there are four possible inputs, viz. (T, T), (T, F), (F, T), and (F, F), thus yielding sixteen possible binary truth functions – in general, there are $2^{2^n}$ n-ary truth functions for each natural number n. The sixteen possible binary truth functions are listed in the table below.

Binary truth functions
| p | q | T | NAND | → | NOT p | ← | NOT q | ↔ | NOR | OR | XOR | q | NOT ← | p | NOT → | AND | F |
|---|---|---|---|---|---|---|---|---|---|---|---|---|---|---|---|---|---|
| T | T | T | F | T | F | T | F | T | F | T | F | T | F | T | F | T | F |
| T | F | T | T | F | F | T | T | F | F | T | T | F | F | T | T | F | F |
| F | T | T | T | T | T | F | F | F | F | T | T | T | T | F | F | F | F |
| F | F | T | T | T | T | T | T | T | T | F | F | F | F | F | F | F | F |

== Content ==
Zellweger's logic alphabet offers a visually systematic way of representing each of the sixteen binary truth functions. The idea behind the logic alphabet is to first represent the sixteen binary truth functions in the form of a square matrix rather than the more familiar tabular format seen in the table above, and then to assign a letter shape to each of these matrices. Letter shapes are derived from the distribution of Ts in the matrix. When drawing a logic symbol, one passes through each square with assigned F values while stopping in a square with assigned T values. In the extreme examples, the symbol for tautology is an X (stops in all four squares), while the symbol for contradiction is an O (passing through all squares without stopping). The square matrix corresponding to each binary truth function, as well as its corresponding letter shape, are displayed in the table below.

Symbols
| Conventional symbol | Matrix | Logic alphabet shape |
|---|---|---|
| T | | |
| NAND | | |
| → | | |
| NOT p | | |
| ← | | |
| NOT q | | |
| ↔ | | |
| NOR | | |
| OR | | |
| XOR | | |
| q | | |
| NOT ← | | |
| p | | |
| NOT → | | |
| AND | | |
| F | | |

== Significance ==
The interest of the logic alphabet lies in its aesthetic, symmetric, and geometric qualities. These qualities combine to allow an individual to more easily, rapidly and visually manipulate the relationships between entire truth tables. A logic operation performed on a two-dimensional logic alphabet connective, with its geometric qualities, produces a symmetry transformation. When a symmetry transformation occurs, each input symbol, without any further thought, immediately changes into the correct output symbol. For example, by reflecting the symbol for NAND (viz. 'h') across the vertical axis we produce the symbol for ←, whereas by reflecting it across the horizontal axis we produce the symbol for →, and by reflecting it across both the horizontal and vertical axes we produce the symbol for ∨. Similar symmetry transformations can be obtained by operating upon the other symbols.

In effect, the X-stem Logic Alphabet is derived from three disciplines that have been stacked and combined: (1) mathematics, (2) logic, and (3) semiotics. This happens because, in keeping with the mathelogical semiotics, the connectives have been custom designed in the form of geometric letter shapes that serve as iconic replicas of their corresponding square-framed truth tables. Logic cannot do it alone. Logic is sandwiched between mathematics and semiotics. Indeed, Zellweger has constructed intriguing structures involving the symbols of the logic alphabet on the basis of these symmetries ( ). The considerable aesthetic appeal of the logic alphabet has led to exhibitions of Zellweger's work at the Museum of Jurassic Technology in Los Angeles, among other places.

The value of the logic alphabet lies in its use as a visually simpler pedagogical tool than the traditional system for logic notation. The logic alphabet eases the introduction to the fundamentals of logic, especially for children, at much earlier stages of cognitive development. Because the logic notation system, in current use today, is so deeply embedded in our computer culture, the "logic alphabets" adoption and value by the field of logic itself, at this juncture, is questionable. Additionally, systems of natural deduction, for example, generally require introduction and elimination rules for each connective, meaning that the use of all sixteen binary connectives would result in a highly complex proof system. Various subsets of the sixteen binary connectives (e.g., {∨,&,→,~}, {∨,~}, {&, ~}, {→,~}) are themselves functionally complete in that they suffice to define the remaining connectives. In fact, both NAND and NOR are sole sufficient operators, meaning that the remaining connectives can all be defined solely in terms of either of them. Nonetheless, the logic alphabet’s two-dimensional geometric letter shapes along with its group symmetry properties can help ease the learning curve for children and adult students alike, as they become familiar with the interrelations and operations on all 16 binary connectives. Giving children and students this advantage is a decided gain.

== See also ==
- Polish notation
- Propositional logic
- Boolean function
- Boolean algebra (logic)
- Logic gate
