= False (logic) =

Possessing negative truth value

In logic, false (Its noun form is falsity) or untrue is the state of possessing negative truth value and is a nullary logical connective. In a truth-functional system of propositional logic, it is one of two postulated truth values, along with its negation, truth. Usual notations of the false are 0 (especially in Boolean logic and computer science), O (in prefix notation, Opq), and the up tack symbol $\bot$.

Another approach is used for several formal theories (e.g., intuitionistic propositional calculus), where a propositional constant (i.e. a nullary connective), $\bot$, is introduced, the truth value of which being always false in the sense above. It can be treated as an absurd proposition, and is often called absurdity.

== In classical logic and Boolean logic ==
In Boolean logic, each variable denotes a truth value which can be either true (1), or false (0).

In a classical propositional calculus, each proposition will be assigned a truth value of either true or false. Some systems of classical logic include dedicated symbols for false (0 or $\bot$), while others instead rely upon formulas such as p ∧ ¬p and ¬(p → p).

In both Boolean logic and Classical logic systems, true and false are opposite with respect to negation; the negation of false gives true, and the negation of true gives false.

=== Truth Tables ===
==== Negation (¬) ====
| $x$ | $\neg x$ |
|---|---|
| true | false |
| false | true |

The negation of false is equivalent to the truth not only in classical logic and Boolean logic, but also in most other logical systems, as explained below.

==== Conjunction (AND ∧) ====
False ∧ True = False (False AND anything is False).

==== Disjunction (OR ∨) ====
False ∨ True = True (OR is True if at least one operand is True).

==== Implication (→) ====
False → True = True (A false premise makes the implication vacuously true).

== False, negation and contradiction ==
In most logical systems, negation, material conditional and false are related as:

¬p ⇔ (p → ⊥)

In fact, this is the definition of negation in some systems, such as intuitionistic logic, and can be proven in propositional calculi where negation is a fundamental connective. Because p → p is usually a theorem or axiom, a consequence is that the negation of false (¬ ⊥) is true.

A contradiction is the situation that arises when a statement that is assumed to be true is shown to entail false (i.e., φ ⊢ ⊥). Using the equivalence above, the fact that φ is a contradiction may be derived, for example, from ⊢ ¬φ. A statement that entails false itself is sometimes called a contradiction, and contradictions and false are sometimes not distinguished, especially due to the Latin term falsum being used in English to denote either, but false is one specific proposition.

Logical systems may or may not contain the principle of explosion (ex falso quodlibet in Latin), ⊥ ⊢ φ for all φ. By that principle, contradictions and false are equivalent, since each entails the other.

== Consistency ==
A formal theory using the "$\bot$" connective is defined to be consistent, if and only if the false is not among its theorems. In the absence of propositional constants, some substitutes (such as the ones described above) may be used instead to define consistency.

== See also ==
- Contradiction
- Logical truth
- Tautology (logic) (for symbolism of logical truth)
- Truth table
