= Up tack =

Symbol used in mathematics and logic

"Up tack" is the Unicode name for a symbol (⊥, \bot in LaTeX, U+22A5 in Unicode) that is also called "bottom", "falsum", "absurdum", or "absurdity", depending on context. It is used to represent:

- The truth value 'false', or a logical constant denoting a proposition in logic that is always false. (The names "falsum", "absurdum" and "absurdity" come from this context.)
- The bottom element in wheel theory and lattice theory, which also represents absurdum when used for logical semantics
- The bottom type in type theory, which is the bottom element in the subtype relation. This may coincide with the empty type, which represents absurdum under the Curry–Howard correspondence
- The "undefined value" in quantum physics interpretations that reject counterfactual definiteness, as in (r_{0},⊥)

as well as

- Mixed radix decoding in the APL programming language

The glyph of the up tack appears as an upside-down tee symbol, and as such is sometimes called eet (the word "tee" in reverse). Tee plays a complementary or dual role in many of these theories.

The similar-looking perpendicular symbol (⟂, \perp in LaTeX, U+27C2 in Unicode) is a binary relation symbol used to represent:

- Perpendicularity of lines in geometry
- Orthogonality in linear algebra
- Independence of random variables in probability theory
- Coprimality in number theory

Historically, in character sets before Unicode 4.1 (March 2005), such as Unicode 4.0 and JIS X 0213, the perpendicular symbol was encoded with the same code point as the up tack, specifically U+22A5 in Unicode 4.0. This overlap is reflected in the fact that both HTML entities &perp; and &bot; refer to the same code point U+22A5, as shown in the HTML entity list. In March 2005, Unicode 4.1 introduced the distinct symbol "⟂" (U+27C2 "PERPENDICULAR") with a reference back to ⊥ (U+22A5 "UP TACK") and a note that "typeset with additional spacing."

The double tack up symbol (⫫, U+2AEB in Unicode) is a binary relation symbol used to represent:

- Conditional independence of random variables in probability theory

== See also ==
- Alternative plus sign
- Contradiction
- List of mathematical symbols
- Tee (symbol) (⊤)
