= Logical consequence =

Relationship in which one statement follows from another

Logical consequence (also entailment or logical implication) is a fundamental concept in logic which describes the relationship between statements that hold true when one statement logically follows from one or more statements. A valid logical argument is one in which the conclusion is entailed by the premises, because the conclusion is the consequence of the premises. The philosophical analysis of logical consequence involves the following questions: In what sense does a conclusion follow from its premises? and What does it mean for a conclusion to be a consequence of premises? All of philosophical logic is meant to provide accounts of the nature of logical consequence and the nature of logical truth.

Logical consequence is necessary and formal, by way of examples that explain with formal proof and models of interpretation. A sentence is said to be a logical consequence of a set of sentences, for a given language, if and only if, using only logic (i.e., without regard to any personal interpretations of the sentences) the sentence must be true if every sentence in the set is true.

Logicians make precise accounts of logical consequence regarding a given language $\mathcal{L}$, either by constructing a deductive system for $\mathcal{L}$ or by formal intended semantics for language $\mathcal{L}$. The Polish logician Alfred Tarski identified three features of an adequate characterization of entailment: (1) The logical consequence relation relies on the logical form of the sentences: (2) The relation is a priori, i.e., it can be determined with or without regard to empirical evidence (sense experience); and (3) The logical consequence relation has a modal component.

== Formal accounts ==
The most widely prevailing view on how best to account for logical consequence is to appeal to formality. This is to say that whether statements follow from one another logically depends on the structure or logical form of the statements without regard to the contents of that form.

Syntactic accounts of logical consequence rely on schemes using inference rules. For instance, we can express the logical form of a valid argument as:

All X are Y
All Y are Z
Therefore, all X are Z.

This argument is formally valid, because every instance of arguments constructed using this scheme is valid.

This is in contrast to an argument like "Fred is Mike's brother's son. Therefore Fred is Mike's nephew." Since this argument depends on the meanings of the words "brother", "son", and "nephew", the statement "Fred is Mike's nephew" is a so-called material consequence of "Fred is Mike's brother's son", not a formal consequence. A formal consequence must be true in all cases, however this is an incomplete definition of formal consequence, since even the argument "P is Q's brother's son, therefore P is Q's nephew" is valid in all cases, but is not a formal argument.

== A priori property ==
If it is known that $Q$ follows logically from $P$, then no information about the possible interpretations of $P$ or $Q$ will affect that knowledge. Our knowledge that $Q$ is a logical consequence of $P$ cannot be influenced by empirical knowledge. Deductively valid arguments can be known to be so without recourse to experience, so they must be knowable a priori. However, formality alone does not guarantee that logical consequence is not influenced by empirical knowledge. So the a priori property of logical consequence is considered to be independent of formality.

== Proofs and models ==
The two prevailing techniques for providing accounts of logical consequence involve expressing the concept in terms of proofs and via models. The study of the syntactic consequence (of a logic) is called (its) proof theory whereas the study of (its) semantic consequence is called (its) model theory.

=== Syntactic consequence ===
A formula $A$ is a syntactic consequence within some formal system $\mathcal{FS}$ of a set $\Gamma$ of formulas if there is a formal proof in $\mathcal{FS}$ of $A$ from the set $\Gamma$. This is denoted $\Gamma \vdash_{\mathcal {FS} } A$. The turnstile symbol $\vdash$ was originally introduced by Frege in 1879, but its current use only dates back to Rosser and Kleene (1934–1935).

Syntactic consequence does not depend on any interpretation of the formal system.

=== Semantic consequence ===
A formula $A$ is a semantic consequence within some formal system $\mathcal{FS}$ of a set of statements $\Gamma$ if and only if there is no model $\mathcal{I}$ in which all members of $\Gamma$ are true and $A$ is false. This is denoted $\Gamma \models_{\mathcal {FS} } A$. Or, in other words, the set of the interpretations that make all members of $\Gamma$ true is a subset of the set of the interpretations that make $A$ true.

== Modal accounts ==
Modal accounts of logical consequence are variations on the following basic idea:

$\Gamma$ $\vdash$ $A$ is true if and only if it is necessary that if all of the elements of $\Gamma$ are true, then $A$ is true.

Alternatively (and, most would say, equivalently):

$\Gamma$ $\vdash$ $A$ is true if and only if it is impossible for all of the elements of $\Gamma$ to be true and $A$ false.

Such accounts are called "modal" because they appeal to the modal notions of logical necessity and logical possibility. 'It is necessary that' is often expressed as a universal quantifier over possible worlds, so that the accounts above translate as:

$\Gamma$ $\vdash$ $A$ is true if and only if there is no possible world at which all of the elements of $\Gamma$ are true and $A$ is false (untrue).

Consider the modal account in terms of the argument given as an example above:

All frogs are green.
Kermit is a frog.
Therefore, Kermit is green.

The conclusion is a logical consequence of the premises because we can not imagine a possible world where (a) all frogs are green; (b) Kermit is a frog; and (c) Kermit is not green.

=== Modal-formal accounts ===
Modal-formal accounts of logical consequence combine the modal and formal accounts above, yielding variations on the following basic idea:

$\Gamma$ $\vdash$ $A$ if and only if it is impossible for an argument with the same logical form as $\Gamma$/$A$ to have true premises and a false conclusion.

=== Warrant-based accounts ===
The accounts considered above are all "truth-preservational", in that they all assume that the characteristic feature of a good inference is that it never allows one to move from true premises to an untrue conclusion. As an alternative, some have proposed "warrant-preservational" accounts, according to which the characteristic feature of a good inference is that it never allows one to move from justifiably assertible premises to a conclusion that is not justifiably assertible. This is (roughly) the account favored by intuitionists.

=== Non-monotonic logical consequence ===
The accounts discussed above all yield monotonic consequence relations, i.e. ones such that if $A$ is a consequence of $\Gamma$, then $A$ is a consequence of any superset of $\Gamma$. It is also possible to specify non-monotonic consequence relations to capture the idea that, e.g., 'Tweety can fly' is a logical consequence of

{Birds can typically fly, Tweety is a bird}

but not of

{Birds can typically fly, Tweety is a bird, Tweety is a penguin}.

== See also ==
- Abstract algebraic logic
- Ampheck
- Boolean algebra (logic)
- Boolean domain
- Boolean function
- Boolean logic
- Causality
- Deductive reasoning
- Logic gate
- Logical graph
- Peirce's law
- Probabilistic logic
- Propositional calculus
- Sole sufficient operator
- Strawson entailment
- Strict conditional
- Tautology (logic)
- Tautological consequence
- Therefore sign
- Turnstile (symbol)
- Double turnstile
- Validity

== Resources ==
- Anderson, A.R.; Belnap, N.D. Jr. (1975), Entailment, vol. 1, Princeton, NJ: Princeton.
- Augusto, Luis M. (2017), Logical consequences. Theory and applications: An introduction. London: College Publications. Series: Mathematical logic and foundations.
- Barwise, Jon; Etchemendy, John (2008), Language, Proof and Logic, Stanford: CSLI Publications.
- Brown, Frank Markham (2003), Boolean Reasoning: The Logic of Boolean Equations 1st edition, Kluwer Academic Publishers, Norwell, MA. 2nd edition, Dover Publications, Mineola, NY, 2003.
- Davis, Martin, ed. (1965), The Undecidable, Basic Papers on Undecidable Propositions, Unsolvable Problems And Computable Functions, New York: Raven Press, ISBN 9780486432281. Papers include those by Gödel, Church, Rosser, Kleene, and Post.
- Dummett, Michael (1991), The Logical Basis of Metaphysics, Harvard University Press, ISBN 9780674537866.
- Edgington, Dorothy (2001), Conditionals, Blackwell in Lou Goble (ed.), The Blackwell Guide to Philosophical Logic.
- Edgington, Dorothy (2006), "Indicative Conditionals", Conditionals, Metaphysics Research Lab, Stanford University in Edward N. Zalta (ed.), The Stanford Encyclopedia of Philosophy.
- Etchemendy, John (1990), The Concept of Logical Consequence, Harvard University Press.
- Goble, Lou, ed. (2001), The Blackwell Guide to Philosophical Logic, Blackwell.
- Hanson, William H (1997), "The concept of logical consequence", The Philosophical Review, 106 (3): 365–409, doi:10.2307/2998398, JSTOR 2998398 365–409.
- Hendricks, Vincent F. (2005), Thought 2 Talk: A Crash Course in Reflection and Expression, New York: Automatic Press / VIP, ISBN 978-87-991013-7-5
- Planchette, P. A. (2001), Logical Consequence in Goble, Lou, ed., The Blackwell Guide to Philosophical Logic. Blackwell.
- Quine, W.V. (1982), Methods of Logic, Cambridge, MA: Harvard University Press (1st ed. 1950), (2nd ed. 1959), (3rd ed. 1972), (4th edition, 1982).
- Shapiro, Stewart (2002), Necessity, meaning, and rationality: the notion of logical consequence in D. Jacquette, ed., A Companion to Philosophical Logic. Blackwell.
- Tarski, Alfred (1936), On the concept of logical consequence Reprinted in Tarski, A., 1983. Logic, Semantics, Metamathematics, 2nd ed. Oxford University Press. Originally published in Polish and German.
- Ryszard Wójcicki (1988). Theory of Logical Calculi: Basic Theory of Consequence Operations. Springer. ISBN 978-90-277-2785-5.
- A paper on 'implication' from math.niu.edu, Implication
- A definition of 'implicant' AllWords
