= Tautology (logic) =

In logic, a statement which is always true

In mathematical logic, a tautology (from Ancient Greek: ταυτολογία) is a formula that is true regardless of the interpretation of its component terms, with only the logical constants having a fixed meaning. It is a logical truth. For example, a formula that states "the ball is green or the ball is not green" is always true, regardless of what a ball is and regardless of its colour. Tautology is usually, though not always, used to refer to valid formulas of propositional logic.

The philosopher Ludwig Wittgenstein first applied the term to redundancies of propositional logic in 1921, borrowing from rhetoric, where a tautology is a repetitive statement. In logic, a formula is satisfiable if it is true under at least one interpretation, and thus a tautology is a formula whose negation is unsatisfiable. In other words, it cannot be false.

Unsatisfiable statements, both through negation and affirmation, are known formally as contradictions. A formula that is neither a tautology nor a contradiction is said to be logically contingent. Such a formula can be made either true or false based on the values assigned to its propositional variables.

The double turnstile notation $\vDash S$ is used to indicate that S is a tautology. Tautology is sometimes symbolized by "Vpq", and contradiction by "Opq". The tee symbol $\top$ is sometimes used to denote an arbitrary tautology, with the dual symbol $\bot$ (falsum) representing an arbitrary contradiction; in any symbolism, a tautology may be substituted for the truth value "true", as symbolized, for instance, by "1".

Tautologies are a key concept in propositional logic, where a tautology is defined as a propositional formula that is true under any possible Boolean valuation of its propositional variables. A key property of tautologies in propositional logic is that an effective method exists for testing whether a given formula is always satisfied (equiv., whether its negation is unsatisfiable).

The definition of tautology can be extended to sentences in predicate logic, which may contain quantifiers—a feature absent from sentences of propositional logic. Indeed, in propositional logic, there is no distinction between a tautology and a logically valid formula. In the context of predicate logic, many authors define a tautology to be a sentence that can be obtained by taking a tautology of propositional logic, and uniformly replacing each propositional variable by a first-order formula (one formula per propositional variable). The set of such formulas is a proper subset of the set of logically valid sentences of predicate logic (i.e., sentences that are true in every model).

== History ==
The word tautology was used by the ancient Greeks to describe a statement that was asserted to be true merely by virtue of saying the same thing twice, a pejorative meaning that is still used for rhetorical tautologies. Between 1800 and 1940, the word gained new meaning in logic, and is currently used in mathematical logic to denote a certain type of propositional formula, without the pejorative connotations it originally possessed.

In 1800, Immanuel Kant wrote in his book Logic:

The identity of concepts in analytical judgments can be either explicit (explicita) or non-explicit (implicita). In the former case analytic propositions are tautological.

Here, analytic proposition refers to an analytic truth, a statement in natural language that is true solely because of the terms involved.

In 1884, Gottlob Frege proposed in his Grundlagen that a truth is analytic exactly if it can be derived using logic. However, he maintained a distinction between analytic truths (i.e., truths based only on the meanings of their terms) and tautologies (i.e., statements devoid of content).

In his Tractatus Logico-Philosophicus in 1921, Ludwig Wittgenstein proposed that statements that can be deduced by logical deduction are tautological (empty of meaning), as well as being analytic truths. Henri Poincaré had made similar remarks in Science and Hypothesis in 1905. Although Bertrand Russell at first argued against these remarks by Wittgenstein and Poincaré, claiming that mathematical truths were not only non-tautologous but were synthetic, he later spoke in favor of them in 1918:

Everything that is a proposition of logic has got to be in some sense or the other like a tautology. It has got to be something that has some peculiar quality, which I do not know how to define, that belongs to logical propositions but not to others.

Here, logical proposition refers to a proposition that is provable using the laws of logic.

Many logicians in the early 20th century used the term 'tautology' for any formula that is universally valid, whether a formula of propositional logic or of predicate logic. In this broad sense, a tautology is a formula that is true under all interpretations, or that is logically equivalent to the negation of a contradiction. Tarski and Gödel followed this usage and it appears in textbooks such as that of Lewis and Langford. This broad use of the term is less common today, though some textbooks continue to use it.

Modern textbooks more commonly restrict the use of 'tautology' to valid sentences of propositional logic, or valid sentences of predicate logic that can be reduced to propositional tautologies by substitution.

== Background ==
Propositional logic begins with propositional variables, atomic units that represent concrete propositions. A formula consists of propositional variables connected by logical connectives, built up in such a way that the truth of the overall formula can be deduced from the truth or falsity of each variable. A valuation is a function that assigns each propositional variable to either T (for truth) or F (for falsity). So by using the propositional variables A and B, the binary connectives $\lor$ and $\land$ representing disjunction and conjunction respectively, and the unary connective $\lnot$ representing negation, the following formula can be obtained:$(A \land B) \lor (\lnot A) \lor (\lnot B)$.

A valuation here must assign to each of A and B either T or F. But no matter how this assignment is made, the overall formula will come out true. For if the first disjunct $(A \land B)$ is not satisfied by a particular valuation, then A or B must be assigned F, which will make one of the following disjunct to be assigned T. In natural language, either both A and B are true or at least one of them is false.

== Definition and examples ==
A formula of propositional logic is a tautology if the formula itself is always true, regardless of which valuation is used for the propositional variables. There are infinitely many tautologies.

In many of the following examples A represents the statement "object X is bound", B represents "object X is a book", and C represents "object X is on the shelf". Without a specific referent object X, $A \to B$ corresponds to the proposition "all bound things are books".

- $(A \lor \lnot A)$ ("A or not A"), the law of excluded middle. This formula has only one propositional variable, A. Any valuation for this formula must, by definition, assign A one of the truth values true or false, and assign $\lnot$A the other truth value. For instance, "The cat is black or the cat is not black".
- $(A \to B) \Leftrightarrow (\lnot B \to \lnot A)$ ("if A implies B, then not-B implies not-A", and vice versa), which expresses the law of contraposition. For instance, "If it's bound, it is a book; if it's not a book, it's not bound" and vice versa.
- $((\lnot A \to B) \land (\lnot A \to \lnot B)) \to A$ ("if not-A implies both B and its negation not-B, then not-A must be false, then A must be true"), which is the principle known as reductio ad absurdum. For instance, "If it's not bound, we know it's a book; if it's not bound, we know it's also not a book, so it is bound".
- $\lnot(A \land B) \Leftrightarrow (\lnot A \lor \lnot B)$ ("if not both A and B, then not-A or not-B", and vice versa), which is known as De Morgan's law. "If it is not both a book and bound, then we are sure that it's not a book or that it's not bound" and vice versa.
- $((A \to B) \land (B \to C)) \to (A \to C)$ ("if A implies B and B implies C, then A implies C"), which is the principle known as hypothetical syllogism. "If it's bound, then it's a book and if it's a book, then it's on that shelf, so if it's bound, it's on that shelf".
- $((A \lor B) \land (A \to C) \land (B \to C)) \to C$ ("if at least one of A or B is true, and each implies C, then C must be true as well"), which is the principle known as proof by cases. "Bound things and books are on that shelf. If it's either a book or it's bound, it's on that shelf".

A minimal tautology is a tautology that is not the instance of a shorter tautology.

- $(A \lor B) \to (A \lor B)$ is a tautology, but not a minimal one, because it is an instantiation of $C \to C$.

== Verifying tautologies ==
The problem of determining whether a formula is a tautology is fundamental in propositional logic. If there are n variables occurring in a formula then there are 2^{n} distinct valuations for the formula. Therefore, the task of determining whether or not the formula is a tautology is a finite and mechanical one: one needs only to evaluate the truth value of the formula under each of its possible valuations. One algorithmic method for verifying that every valuation makes the formula to be true is to make a truth table that includes every possible valuation.

For example, consider the formula

$$((A \land B) \to C) \Leftrightarrow (A \to (B \to C)).$$

There are 8 possible valuations for the propositional variables A, B, C, represented by the first three columns of the following table. The remaining columns show the truth of subformulas of the formula above, culminating in a column showing the truth value of the original formula under each valuation.

$A$	$B$	$C$	$A \land B$	$(A \land B) \to C$	$B \to C$	$A \to (B \to C)$	$((A \land B) \to C) \Leftrightarrow (A \to (B \to C))$
T	T	T	T	T	T	T	T
T	T	F	T	F	F	F	T
T	F	T	F	T	T	T	T
T	F	F	F	T	T	T	T
F	T	T	F	T	T	T	T
F	T	F	F	T	F	T	T
F	F	T	F	T	T	T	T
F	F	F	F	T	T	T	T

Because each row of the final column shows T, the sentence in question is verified to be a tautology.

It is also possible to define a deductive system (i.e., proof system) for propositional logic, as a simpler variant of the deductive systems employed for first-order logic (see Kleene 1967, Sec 1.9 for one such system). A proof of a tautology in an appropriate deduction system may be much shorter than a complete truth table (a formula with n propositional variables requires a truth table with 2^{n} lines, which quickly becomes infeasible as n increases). Proof systems are also required for the study of intuitionistic propositional logic, in which the method of truth tables cannot be employed because the law of the excluded middle is not assumed.

== Tautological implication ==
A formula R is said to tautologically imply a formula S if every valuation that causes R to be true also causes S to be true. This situation is denoted $R \models S$. It is equivalent to the formula $R \to S$ being a tautology (Kleene 1967 p. 27).

For example, let $S$ be $A \land (B \lor \lnot B)$. Then $S$ is not a tautology, because any valuation that makes $A$ false will make $S$ false. But any valuation that makes $A$ true will make $S$ true, because $B \lor \lnot B$ is a tautology. Let $R$ be the formula $A \land C$. Then $R \models S$, because any valuation satisfying $R$ will make $A$ true—and thus makes $S$ true.

It follows from the definition that if a formula $R$ is a contradiction, then $R$ tautologically implies every formula, because there is no truth valuation that causes $R$ to be true, and so the definition of tautological implication is trivially satisfied. Similarly, if $S$ is a tautology, then $S$ is tautologically implied by every formula.

== Substitution ==
There is a general procedure, the substitution rule, that allows additional tautologies to be constructed from a given tautology (Kleene 1967 sec. 3). Suppose that S is a tautology and for each propositional variable A in S a fixed sentence S_{A} is chosen. Then the sentence obtained by replacing each variable A in S with the corresponding sentence S_{A} is also a tautology.

For example, let S be the tautology:

$$(A \land B) \lor \lnot A \lor \lnot B$$.

Let S_{A} be $C \lor D$ and let S_{B} be $C \to E$.

It follows from the substitution rule that the sentence:

$$((C \lor D) \land (C \to E)) \lor \lnot (C \lor D) \lor \lnot (C \to E)$$

is also a tautology.

== Semantic completeness and soundness ==
An axiomatic system is complete if every tautology is a theorem (derivable from axioms). An axiomatic system is sound if every theorem is a tautology.

== Efficient verification and the Boolean satisfiability problem ==
The problem of constructing practical algorithms to determine whether sentences with large numbers of propositional variables are tautologies is an area of contemporary research in the area of automated theorem proving.

The method of truth tables illustrated above is provably correct – the truth table for a tautology will end in a column with only T, while the truth table for a sentence that is not a tautology will contain a row whose final column is F, and the valuation corresponding to that row is a valuation that does not satisfy the sentence being tested. This method for verifying tautologies is an effective procedure, which means that given unlimited computational resources it can always be used to mechanistically determine whether a sentence is a tautology. This means, in particular, the set of tautologies over a fixed finite or countable alphabet is a decidable set.

As an efficient procedure, however, truth tables are constrained by the fact that the number of valuations that must be checked increases as 2^{k}, where k is the number of variables in the formula. This exponential growth in the computation length renders the truth table method useless for formulas with thousands of propositional variables, as contemporary computing hardware cannot execute the algorithm in a feasible time period.

The problem of determining whether there is any valuation that makes a formula true is the Boolean satisfiability problem; the problem of checking tautologies is equivalent to this problem, because verifying that a sentence S is a tautology is equivalent to verifying that there is no valuation satisfying $\lnot S$. The Boolean satisfiability problem is NP-complete, and consequently, tautology is co-NP-complete. It is widely believed that (equivalently for all NP-complete problems) no polynomial-time algorithm can solve the satisfiability problem, although some algorithms perform well on special classes of formulas, or terminate quickly on many instances.

== Tautologies versus validities in first-order logic ==
The fundamental definition of a tautology is in the context of propositional logic. The definition can be extended, however, to sentences in first-order logic. These sentences may contain quantifiers, unlike sentences of propositional logic. In the context of first-order logic, a distinction is maintained between logical validities, sentences that are true in every model, and tautologies (or, tautological validities), which are a proper subset of the first-order logical validities. In the context of propositional logic, these two terms coincide.

A tautology in first-order logic is a sentence that can be obtained by taking a tautology of propositional logic and uniformly replacing each propositional variable by a first-order formula (one formula per propositional variable). For example, because $A \lor \lnot A$ is a tautology of propositional logic, $(\forall x ( x = x)) \lor (\lnot \forall x (x = x))$ is a tautology in first order logic. Similarly, in a first-order language with a unary relation symbols R,S,T, the following sentence is a tautology:

$$(((\exists x Rx) \land (\lnot \exists x Sx)) \to \forall x Tx) \Leftrightarrow ((\exists x Rx) \to ((\lnot \exists x Sx) \to \forall x Tx)).$$

It is obtained by replacing $A$ with $\exists x Rx$, $B$ with $\lnot \exists x Sx$, and $C$ with $\forall x Tx$ in the propositional tautology: $((A \land B) \to C) \Leftrightarrow (A \to (B \to C))$.

== Tautologies in Non-Classical Logics ==
Whether a given formula is a tautology depends on the formal system of logic that is in use. For example, the following formula is a tautology of classical logic but not of intuitionistic logic:

$$\neg \neg A \to A$$

== See also ==
=== Normal forms ===
- Algebraic normal form
- Conjunctive normal form
- Disjunctive normal form
- Logic optimization

=== Related logical topics ===
- Boolean algebra
- Boolean domain
- Boolean function
- Contradiction
- False (logic)
- Syllogism
- Law of identity
- List of logic symbols
- Logic synthesis
- Logical consequence
- Logical graph
- Logical truth
- Vacuous truth
