= Premise =

Statement supporting a conclusion

A premise (Note: also spelled premiss and premisse) is a proposition offered to support a conclusion. Premises are true or false statements that act as the starting points of arguments by presenting reasons to substantiate or refute assertions. Each argument is made up of a set of premises together with a conclusion. For example, the premises "all men are mortal" and "Socrates is a man" lead to the conclusion "Socrates is mortal." In ordinary language, premises can appear in the middle of a passage, often marked by indicator words, such as since and because. In formal logic, a common approach is to write each premise on a separate line, known as standard form.

Different types of premises are distinguished by their form of expression, their role in arguments, and their content. Explicit premises are overtly stated, whereas implicit premises are tacitly assumed without appearing in the text, often involving uncontroversial common-sense information shared by speaker and audience. Independent premises present distinct reasons, providing separate support for the conclusion. They contrast with dependent premises, which only work in combination. Other distinctions concern whether premises appear as first or intermediate steps in arguments, whether they are affirmative or negative, whether they refer to specific entities or make general claims, whether they are descriptive or normative, and what internal structure they have.

The role of premises in arguments is typically either to preserve truth when drawing a conclusion, or to transfer justification from accepted statements to the claim for which one is arguing. To succeed, premises must be true or justified and must be relevant to the conclusion. The premises of deductively valid arguments provide the strongest support: if the premises are true, then the conclusion cannot be false. The premises of non-deductive arguments aim to make the conclusion more reasonable or increase its probability, such as inductive, abductive, and analogical arguments. Defective arguments, called fallacies, can often arise from faulty premises. For example, premises may contain false information, confuse the audience with irrelevant details, or use ambiguous terms that mislead by shifting meaning. Premises are central to many fields, including logic, argumentation theory, mathematics, philosophy, science, and law.

== Definition ==
Each argument is made up of a set of premises together with a conclusion. The blue circles P1, P2, and P3 represent premises; the green circle C stands for a conclusion; and the arrows symbolize support.

Premises are propositions offered to support a conclusion. They are assumptions or commitments that serve as the starting points of logical reasoning by presenting considerations to justify or refute standpoints. Each argument is made up of a set of premises together with a conclusion. For example, the argument "All men are mortal. Socrates is a man. Therefore, Socrates is mortal" has two premises ("All men are mortal" and "Socrates is a man") followed by a conclusion ("Therefore, Socrates is mortal").

As a proposition or statement, (Note: The terms proposition and statement are often used as synonyms, but some traditions distinguish between the two.) each premise is either true or false, in contrast to other types of sentences, such as questions and commands. While all premises are propositions, not all propositions function as premises: some serve as conclusions or occur outside arguments. For example, passages that simply report observations, illustrate ideas, or explain events can include statements that do not serve as premises. Premises are further distinguished from theses, which are statements someone aims to justify. Theses are similar to hypotheses, which are tentative assumptions in scientific practice that guide research and are tested by experiments. (Note: Premises also differ from antecedents, which are the first parts of conditional statements. For example, the sentence "If it is an apple, then it is a fruit" is a conditional statement with the antecedent "it is an apple".) By contrast, a statement has to be offered as a reason for a conclusion to count as a premise. The strength of an argument depends on how well the premises support the conclusion. True premises can support a conclusion if they are relevant to it, whereas false premises offer no support.

The word premise comes from the Latin term praemittere, meaning 'to set in front', which has its roots in the preposition prae ('pre, before') and the verb mittere ('to send'). It gave rise to the Latin term praemissa ('premise, the proposition put before'), which was borrowed into Old French as the word premisse in the 14th century. The Old French term entered Middle English with the earliest evidence of use in the late 14th century. Outside its main meaning in discourse, logic, and science, the term premises refers to a piece of land and the buildings on it. Another meaning is found in narrative theory, where the premise of a plot is the foundational idea around which the story revolves.

== Identification of premises ==
The ability to identify premises is central to understanding and assessing arguments. In ordinary language used in everyday discourse, arguments often lack a consistent or standard formal structure: the conclusion may appear before, between, or after the premises, without a fixed order to indicate whether a statement is a premise or a conclusion. This can obscure logical relationships between statements and lead to misinterpretation, particularly in complex arguments involving intertwined premises and nested sub-arguments. One way to identify premises is to look for premise indicators—verbal cues that signal where a premise begins, such as since, because, given that, and as implied by. (Note: Similarly, there are conclusion indicators, such as therefore, consequently, and as a result.) For example, the argument "she is not at home since she has gone to the shop" begins with a conclusion and uses the term since to mark where the premise starts. However, indicator words are not always present, and even when they are, their context-dependent meaning does not guarantee that the statements they introduce are premises.

To analyze and evaluate ordinary-language arguments, logicians usually try to paraphrase them in the standard form to disambiguate their components and clarify their logical structure without relying on context-dependent premise indicators. The standard form presents each premise on a separate line, with the conclusion on the last line. A horizontal bar is often placed between the premises and the conclusion, as in: (Note: The therefore sign ($\therefore$) can also indicate the start of a conclusion, either together with or instead of the horizontal line.)

If Luis went to the dance, then Bernadette went to the dance.
Luis went to the dance.
──────────────────────────────────────
Bernadette went to the dance.

In formal logic, premises and conclusions are typically expressed through symbols that represent propositions and their relations. For example, using the symbols $L$ for "Luis went to the dance", $B$ for "Bernadette went to the dance", and $\to$ for "if ... then ...", the argument can be written as: (Note: The sequent notation is a different way that expresses arguments in a single line: the premises are separated by commas and connected to the conclusion with the turnstile symbol ($\vdash$), as in $L \to B, L \vdash B$.)

$$L \to B$$
$$L$$
──────
$$B$$

== Types ==
Philosophers discuss various types of premises, distinguished by their mode of expression, their role in arguments, and their content.

=== Explicit and implicit ===
Explicit premises are overtly stated in an argument. They are claims that appear directly in the text and function as the main reasons supporting the conclusion. By contrast, implicit or tacit premises are not directly stated but merely implied. Also called enthymematic premises, (Note: The term enthymeme is traditionally associated with Aristotle's work. The modern meaning of the term is 'argument with missing or unstated premises', but it is controversial whether this meaning reflects Aristotle's original usage.) they function as background assumptions that link the explicit premises to the conclusion. For example, the argument "you should not drink that milk because it is expired" has the explicit premise "the milk is expired" while assuming the implicit premise that people should not drink expired milk.

Implicit premises are common in ordinary-language arguments because speakers often omit uncontroversial common-sense information shared with their audience. This practice focuses attention on essential points by omitting obvious or redundant details, promoting efficiency and concision. However, implicit premises can obscure key points or conceal contentious assumptions, confusing the audience by leading them to misinterpret the speaker's position or by making a weak argument look stronger than it is. A key interpretive tool for handling implicit premises is the principle of charity, which recommends selecting the most reasonable statements for the missing premises to reconstruct the strongest version of the argument.

=== Independent and dependent ===
Independent premises present distinct reasons that offer separate support (left), while dependent premises work together and support the conclusion only when combined (right).

Two premises are independent if they present distinct reasons. Also called convergent or coordinate premises, they provide separate support for the conclusion. For example, the argument "I should not buy these shoes because they are too small and too expensive" cites two independent premises for distinct considerations: size and price. Since the premises offer separate reasons, one would still provide some support for the conclusion if the other was removed. Multiple independent premises are often needed when the support from a single premise is not sufficiently strong to establish the conclusion beyond a reasonable doubt. For example, prosecutors in criminal cases may provide a list of independent premises for the defendant's guilt, such as a motive to commit the crime, ownership of the murder weapon, fingerprints at the crime scene, and a lack of alibi.

Two premises are dependent if they work only in combination. Also called joint or linked premises, they function together to present a single reason for the conclusion. For instance, the argument "This song will either be an enormous success or an utter failure. It will not be an enormous success. Therefore, it will be an utter failure" has two premises: one states that there are only two options, and the other rules out one option, leaving the other option as the only candidate. These premises are dependent because neither can support the conclusion alone: the first one does not indicate which option is correct, and the second one leaves open the possibility of a moderate success. Dependent premises are common in deductive reasoning where each premise is often essential for the conclusion.

=== Axioms and intermediate premises ===
In complex arguments with several steps, the same statement can act as a conclusion in one sub-argument and as a premise in another, such as the statement P2.

Axioms are initial assumptions used as first premises in reasoning. In logical systems, they serve as foundational statements from which other statements, called theorems, are derived. For example, a central axiom in Euclidean geometry states that for any two distinct points, there exists a unique line passing through them. Not all premises are axioms, and some premises function as intermediate steps in complex arguments and proofs, as in the following chain of reasoning: "I could not find the keys in the kitchen. Therefore, they are not in the kitchen. They are either in the kitchen or in the bedroom. Therefore, they are in the bedroom." In this example, the statement "they are not in the kitchen" is the conclusion of the first argument and a premise of the second.

=== Others ===
Premises can also be classified by the type of statement they express. Affirmative premises assert that something is the case (e.g. Laika was a dog), whereas negative premises deny that something is the case (e.g. Jumbo was not a dog). Universal statements claim that something holds for all entities, while existential statements assert that something holds at least for one entity, and singular propositions talk about one specific entity, as in the contrast among "all men are mortal", "some men are mortal", and "Aristotle is mortal". (Note: Universal and existential statements use quantifiers, such as all and some. The relations between universal and existential and between affirmative and negative statements played a key role in Aristotle's work, visualized in the square of opposition.) Simple premises consist of a single proposition, whereas compound premises combine several propositions. For example, disjunctive premises use the connective or to express that at least one of several propositions is true, conjunctive premises use the connective and to express that all of several propositions are true, and conditional or hypothetical premises are made up of two propositions linked through an if-then relationship.

In Aristotle's syllogistic logic, each argument rests on two premises: a major premise and a minor premise.

Premises can also be distinguished by their content. Descriptive premises state what is the case, whereas prescriptive or normative premises are about what should be the case. This distinction plays a central role in Hume's law—the thesis that purely descriptive premises cannot support normative conclusions. According to this view, arguments such as "Humans have carnivorous teeth. Therefore, they should eat meat." commit fallacies by concluding what should be from what is.

Syllogistic logic, first formulated by Aristotle, distinguishes between major and minor premises. A syllogism is an argument involving three terms: a major term, a middle term, and a minor term. Those three terms are combined to form two premises and a conclusion, each involving two terms. The major premise is about the major and middle terms, the minor premise is about the minor and middle terms, and the conclusion is about the major and minor terms. For example, the following argument has the major term soldiers, the middle term patriots, and the minor term traitors:

All soldiers are patriots. (major premise)
No traitors are patriots. (minor premise)
─────────────────────────
No traitors are soldiers.

== Role in arguments ==
The purpose of the premises of an argument is to support its conclusion. The aim is usually to preserve truth or transfer justification from accepted statements to the claim being argued for, thereby making it more credible or reasonable. In a successful argument, the premises must be relevant to the conclusion and are themselves typically accepted as true or justified. In some cases, however, they are merely suppositions that are allowed for the sake of the argument to explore their implications. Logicians are primarily interested in whether a set of premises is properly related to a conclusion, whereas other fields, such as physics and history, research which premises are true.

=== Premise adequacy and relevance ===
Premises can be analyzed in terms of their adequacy and relevance. A premise is adequate if it is sufficiently justified or meets the context-specific norms of the argumentative setting. These norms vary significantly with the situational context of the discourse. In some settings, a premise is acceptable by default unless an opponent challenges it. In others, the burden of proof lies with the person introducing it, who is expected to provide compelling reasons. Depending on the context of the discourse, the grounds for accepting a premise may derive from sources of justification such as direct perception, past experience, reasoning, or reliable reports from others. In scientific inquiry, justification follows from the scientific method as hypotheses are empirically tested through systematic experimentation and observation. Further considerations of premise adequacy are whether a premise is plausible, whether the audience is likely to accept it, and whether there are reasonable grounds to challenge it.

A premise is relevant if what it says supports the conclusion. Relevant premises provide grounds that increase the credibility of the conclusion, making it more likely to be true or more reasonable to affirm. Relevance is often tied to argumentation schemes or rules of inference, which serve as general templates for relating premises to conclusions. Deductive and non-deductive reasoning are different ways in which the support is established, varying in strength and structure.

=== Deductive reasoning ===
Deductive arguments follow rules of inference, such as modus ponens.

In deductive arguments, premises provide the strongest possible support for the conclusion. An argument is deductively valid if the truth of its premises guarantees the truth of its conclusion: if the premises are true, the conclusion cannot be false. A deductively valid argument with true premises is called a sound argument. (Note: An argument with false premises can also be valid. However, validity alone is not sufficient to offer support to a conclusion.) Deductive reasoning plays a central role in the formal sciences, such as mathematics, which study abstract systems through axiomatic or symbolic methods.

Deductive arguments follow rules of inference. A rule of inference is a general scheme for drawing conclusions. (Note: As argumentation schemes, rules of inference are not themselves premises but instead patterns of justified transitions from premises to conclusions.) Each rule has a specific pattern that depends only on the logical form of the premises and the conclusion, independent of their concrete content. Modus ponens is a rule of inference with the form "If $P$ then $Q$. $P$. Therefore, $Q$." For example, the argument "If it's Monday then the library is open. It's Monday. Therefore, the library is open" follows modus ponens. Other rules of inference include modus tollens, disjunctive syllogism, and constructive dilemma.

=== Non-deductive reasoning ===
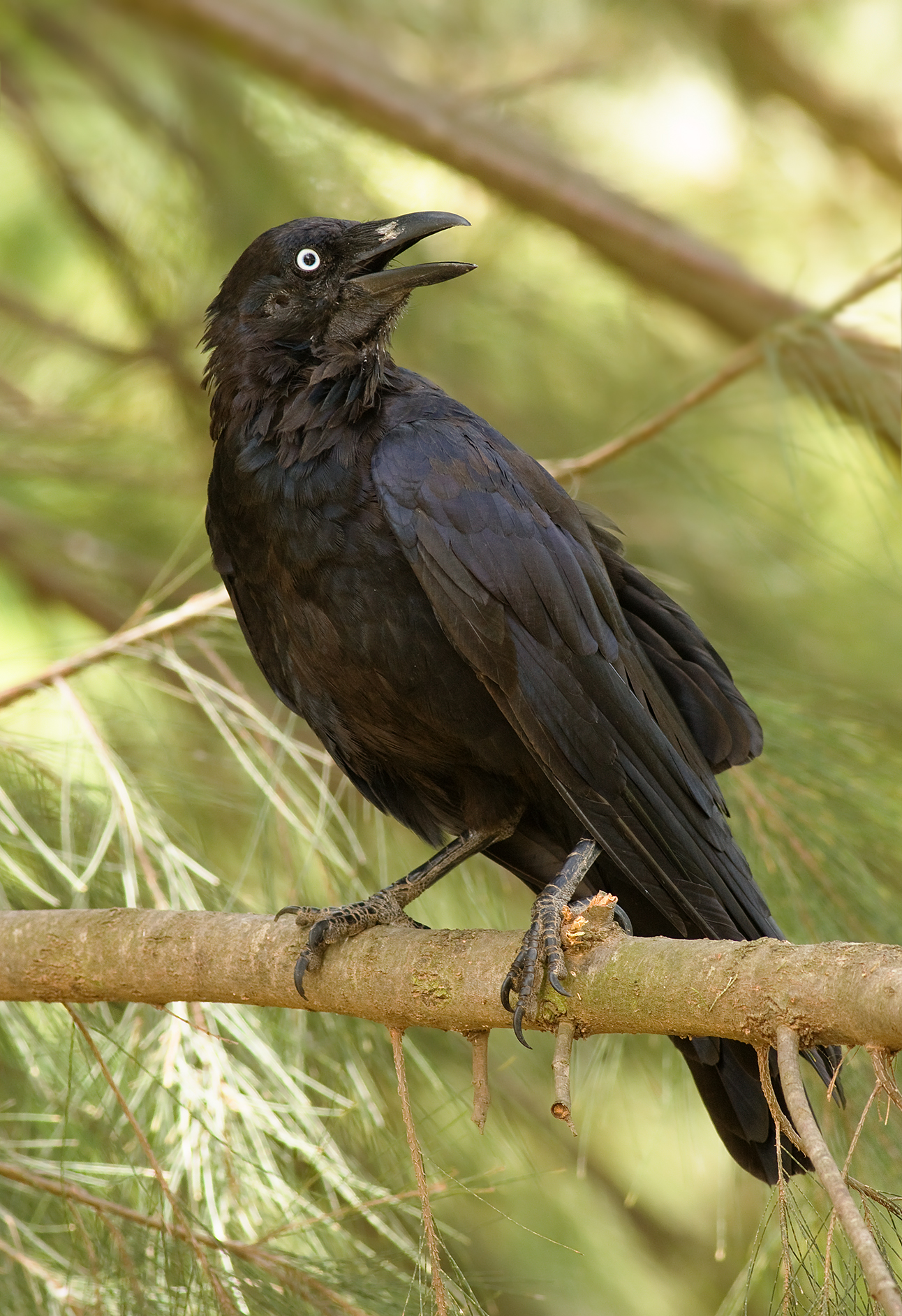
Inductive reasoning is a form of generalization, such as concluding that all ravens are black based on the premise that all ravens one has observed are black.

In non-deductive arguments, premises provide fallible support for the conclusion. They make the conclusion more reasonable or increase the probability that it is true. Non-deductive arguments vary in their degree of strength, and strong ones make their conclusion very plausible. However, they do not guarantee the conclusion: it can be false even when all premises are true. This is because the conclusion introduces information not found in the premises. Non-deductive arguments play a central role in the empirical sciences, which rely on evidence from observation and experiment, and in everyday reasoning. Non-deductive arguments take several forms, including inductive, (Note: The term induction is sometimes used in a broader sense for any type of non-deductive argument.) abductive, and analogical arguments.

Inductive reasoning is a form of generalization. It typically starts from observations of many individual instances and concludes that all instances, including the unobserved ones, follow the same pattern. (Note: A slightly different form of induction draws a conclusion about a single unobserved case, as in the argument that the sun will rise tomorrow because it has risen every day in the past.) The premise of an inductive argument can take the form "All observed individuals with property A also have property B" to support the conclusion "All individuals with property A also have property B." This pattern appears in the argument that all ravens are black because all ravens that were observed are black. The strength of an inductive argument depends on various factors associated with the premises. For example, it is stronger if many instances were observed.

An abductive argument is an inference to the best explanation. Its premises are usually observations one has made, while the conclusion is typically an unobserved cause or mechanism that explains the observations. For example, a doctor may observe that a child has an itchy rash with red spots and conclude that chickenpox is the best explanation of these symptoms. The strength of abductive arguments depends, among other things, on how plausible the explanation is and whether it is consistent with established knowledge.

Analogical reasoning transfers information from one case to another based on their similarity. Analogical arguments can take the form "X is similar to Y. X has property A. Therefore, Y probably also has property A." This pattern appears in the argument "Rats are similar to humans. Birth control pills during pregnancy affect the brain development of rats. Therefore, birth control pills during pregnancy probably also affect the brain development of humans." The strength of analogical arguments depends, among other things, on how similar the cases are and on how pertinent the similarity is to the property in question.

== Fallacies ==
Fallacies are defective arguments that fail to support their conclusions. Faulty premises are the source of many fallacies, either because the premises have inherent flaws or because they are unrelated to the conclusion. The defects in fallacies are often obscured by persuasive language, leading people to mistake them for rational arguments and accept their conclusions. (Note: Whether an argument constitutes a fallacy can depend on context as well as form and content. For example, ad hominem arguments are often fallacious but can be rational in contexts where the speaker's credibility is a central factor.)

In fallacies of presumption, the premises make unwarranted assumptions, (Note: A similar phenomenon occurs in loaded questions, which contain contentious premises regardless of how the respondent answers. For instance, asking whether someone has stopped smoking cannabis assumes that the respondent previously smoked it.) contain false claims, or ignore essential information. For example, in a false dilemma, one premise erroneously claims that only two options are available, excluding other viable alternatives, as in "either I continue smoking, or I gain weight." Begging the question, another fallacy of presumption, is a form of circular reasoning in which the premises already assume that the conclusion is true. Thereby, they fail to provide independent support, as in "capital punishment for murderers is justified because justice requires it." The fallacy of suppressed evidence is a form of cherry-picking that selects only favorable reasons while ignoring stronger opposing evidence, as in the claim that "the US military is weaker today than it was in the 1940s because it has fewer horse-drawn howitzers."

In fallacies of relevance, the premises offer reasons that are not pertinent to the conclusion. For example, the red herring fallacy introduces misleading or distracting information in the premises. It often changes the subject by presenting reasons for a different conclusion, like when the executive of a pesticide company responds to reports of environmental damage by touting the health benefits of fresh fruit and the role of pesticides in increasing crop yields. The ad hominem fallacy seeks to refute an argument by attacking the speaker rather than the argument itself, as when someone dismisses an argument for atheism by alleging that its proponent is arrogant. The appeal to ignorance, another fallacy, defends a claim by offering the premise that no definitive proof against it exists, such as a pseudoscientist asserting that telepathy is real because critics have not yet disproved it.

In fallacies of ambiguity, the premises contain ambiguous language, making it seem as if they support the conclusion. For instance, the premises of the argument "Feathers are light. What is light cannot be dark. Therefore, feathers cannot be dark" use the word "light" in two different senses: one referring to weight, the other to brightness.

In formal fallacies, the source of the error lies in the logical form of an argument. For example, affirming the consequent is a formal fallacy that resembles modus ponens but erroneously swaps one premise with the conclusion, which can happen if the premises are misunderstood.

== In various fields ==
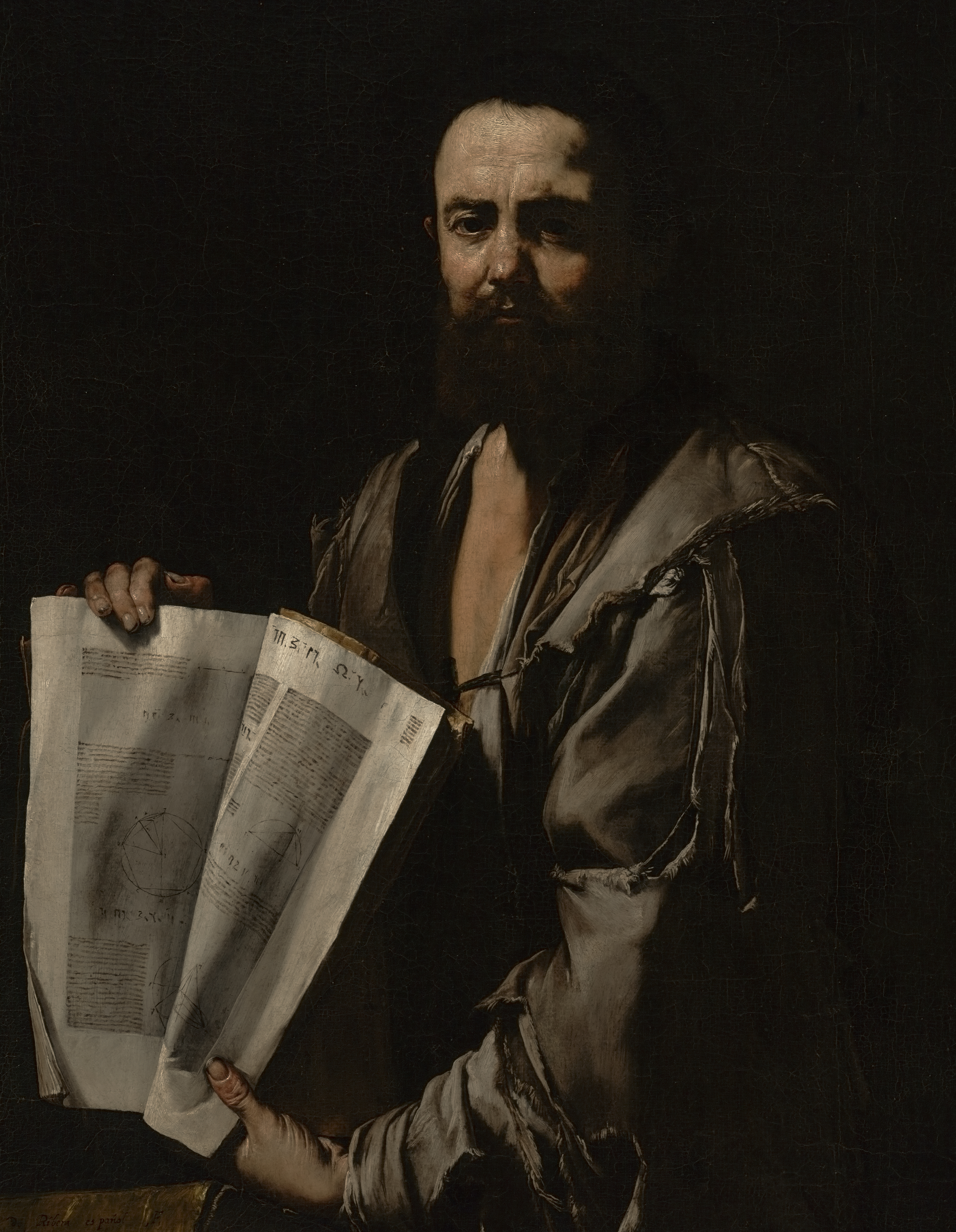
Euclid presented five postulates as basic axioms on which Euclidean geometry rests.

Premises are relevant to many fields of inquiry. Logic and argumentation theory study the structure and standards of arguments. They examine how premises are used to defend standpoints, which argumentation schemes and rules of inference are employed, and how to distinguish good from bad arguments. Logicians often use abstract analysis, representing arguments in a formal, standardized language to reveal their logical form and evaluate their validity. Argumentation theorists, by contrast, tend to focus on how people state premises to defend standpoints in concrete discourse, attending to how contextual factors and dialogical roles shape the norms of argumentation. (Note: Argumentation theory overlaps with informal logic, which examines the strength and persuasiveness of arguments in real-life situations.) Attention to premises is also central in critical thinking when evaluating the basis of an argument, questioning hidden assumptions, and assessing the strength and persuasiveness of supporting reasons.

In mathematics, theorists often posit basic premises as initial axioms from which theorems are deductively inferred. For example, Euclid showed how five fundamental postulates or axioms can serve as the basis of Euclidean geometry. Richard Dedekind, and later Giuseppe Peano, similarly proposed axiomatic foundations for the arithmetic of natural numbers. The approach of building theoretical systems on a small set of foundational premises was also adopted by some philosophers. For instance, Baruch Spinoza constructed his Ethics as a deductive system that derives philosophical theorems from basic axioms. In the empirical sciences, non-deductive reasoning is more common, such as using the premise that all observed instances follow a specific pattern to conclude that the pattern is universal and also holds for unobserved cases. In computer science and artificial intelligence, premises serve as fundamental facts or accepted assumptions encoded in knowledge bases. They act as starting points from which automated reasoning systems, such as automated theorem provers, derive conclusions.

In legal reasoning, premises function as initial assumptions for arriving at decisions about guilt, liability, or entitlement. The legal syllogism is a form of legal reasoning that has one premise for a general legal norm, another premise for the particular case to which the norm is applied, and a conclusion that states the legal consequences. This pattern appears in the argument "If a party breaks a contract, they are liable for damages. The defendant broke a contract. Therefore, they are liable for damages."
