= Necessity and sufficiency =

Terms to describe a conditional relationship between two statements

In logic and mathematics, necessity and sufficiency are concepts used to denote a conditional or implicational relationship between two statements. For example, in the conditional statement: "If P then Q", Q is necessary for P, because the truth of Q is "necessarily" guaranteed by the truth of P. (Equivalently, it is impossible to have P without Q, or the falsity of Q ensures the falsity of P.) Similarly, P is sufficient for Q, because P being true always or "sufficiently" implies that Q is true, but P not being true does not always imply that Q is not true.

In general, a necessary condition is one (possibly one of several conditions) that must be present in order for another condition to occur, while a sufficient condition is one that produces the said condition. The assertion that a statement is a "necessary and sufficient" condition of another means that the former statement is true if and only if the latter is true. That is, the two statements must be either simultaneously true, or simultaneously false.

In ordinary English (also natural language) "necessary" and "sufficient" often indicate relations between conditions or states of affairs, not statements. For example, being round is a necessary condition for being a circle, but is not sufficient since ovals and ellipses are round but not circles – while being a circle is a sufficient condition for being round. Any conditional statement consists of at least one sufficient condition and at least one necessary condition.

In data analytics, necessity and sufficiency can refer to different causal logics, where necessary condition analysis and qualitative comparative analysis can be used as analytical techniques for examining necessity and sufficiency of conditions for a particular outcome of interest.

== Definitions ==
In the conditional statement, "if S, then N", the expression represented by S is called the antecedent, and the expression represented by N is called the consequent. This conditional statement may be written in several equivalent ways, such as "N if S", "S only if N", "S implies N", "N is implied by S", S → N, S ⇒ N and "N whenever S".

In the above situation of "N whenever S", N is said to be a necessary condition for S. In common language, this is equivalent to saying that if the conditional statement is a true statement, then the consequent N must be true—if S is to be true (see third column of "truth table" immediately below). In other words, the antecedent S cannot be true without N being true. For example, in order for someone to be called Socrates, it is necessary for that someone to be Named. Similarly, in order for human beings to live, it is necessary that they have air.

One can also say S is a sufficient condition for N (refer again to the third column of the truth table immediately below). If the conditional statement is true, then if S is true, N must be true; whereas if the conditional statement is true and N is true, then S may be true or be false. In common terms, "the truth of S guarantees the truth of N". For example, carrying on from the previous example, one can say that knowing that someone is called Socrates is sufficient to know that someone has a Name.

A necessary and sufficient condition requires that both of the implications $S \Rightarrow N$ and $N \Rightarrow S$ (the latter of which can also be written as $S \Leftarrow N$) hold. The first implication suggests that S is a sufficient condition for N, while the second implication suggests that S is a necessary condition for N. This is expressed as "S is necessary and sufficient for N ", "S if and only if N", or $S \Leftrightarrow N$.

Truth table
S	N	$S \Rightarrow N$	$S \Leftarrow N$	$S \Leftrightarrow N$
T	T	T	T	T
T	F	F	T	F
F	T	T	F	F
F	F	T	T	T

== Necessity ==
The sun being above the horizon is a necessary condition for direct sunlight; but it is not a sufficient condition, as something else may be casting a shadow, e.g., the moon in the case of an eclipse.

The assertion that Q is necessary for P is colloquially equivalent to "P cannot be true unless Q is true" or "if Q is false, then P is false". By contraposition, this is the same thing as "whenever P is true, so is Q".

The logical relation between P and Q is expressed as "if P, then Q" and denoted "P ⇒ Q" (P implies Q). It may also be expressed as any of "P only if Q", "Q, if P", "Q whenever P", and "Q when P". One often finds, in mathematical prose for instance, several necessary conditions that, taken together, constitute a sufficient condition (i.e., individually necessary and jointly sufficient), as shown in Example 5.

Example 1
For it to be true that "John is a bachelor", it is necessary that it be also true that he is
1. unmarried,
2. male,
3. adult,
since to state "John is a bachelor" implies John has each of those three additional predicates.

Example 2
For the whole numbers greater than two, being odd is necessary to being prime, since two is the only whole number that is both even and prime.

Example 3
Consider thunder, the sound caused by lightning. One says that thunder is necessary for lightning, since lightning never occurs without thunder. Whenever there is lightning, there is thunder. The thunder does not cause the lightning (since lightning causes thunder), but because lightning always comes with thunder, we say that thunder is necessary for lightning. (That is, in its formal sense, necessity doesn't imply causality.)

Example 4
Being at least 30 years old is necessary for serving in the U.S. Senate. If you are under 30 years old, then it is impossible for you to be a senator. That is, if you are a senator, it follows that you must be at least 30 years old.

Example 5
In algebra, for some set S together with an operation $\star$ to form a group, it is necessary that $\star$ be associative. It is also necessary that S include a special element e such that for every x in S, it is the case that e $\star$ x and x $\star$ e both equal x. It is also necessary that for every x in S there exist a corresponding element x″, such that both x $\star$ x″ and x″ $\star$ x equal the special element e. None of these three necessary conditions by itself is sufficient, but the conjunction of the three is.

== Sufficiency ==
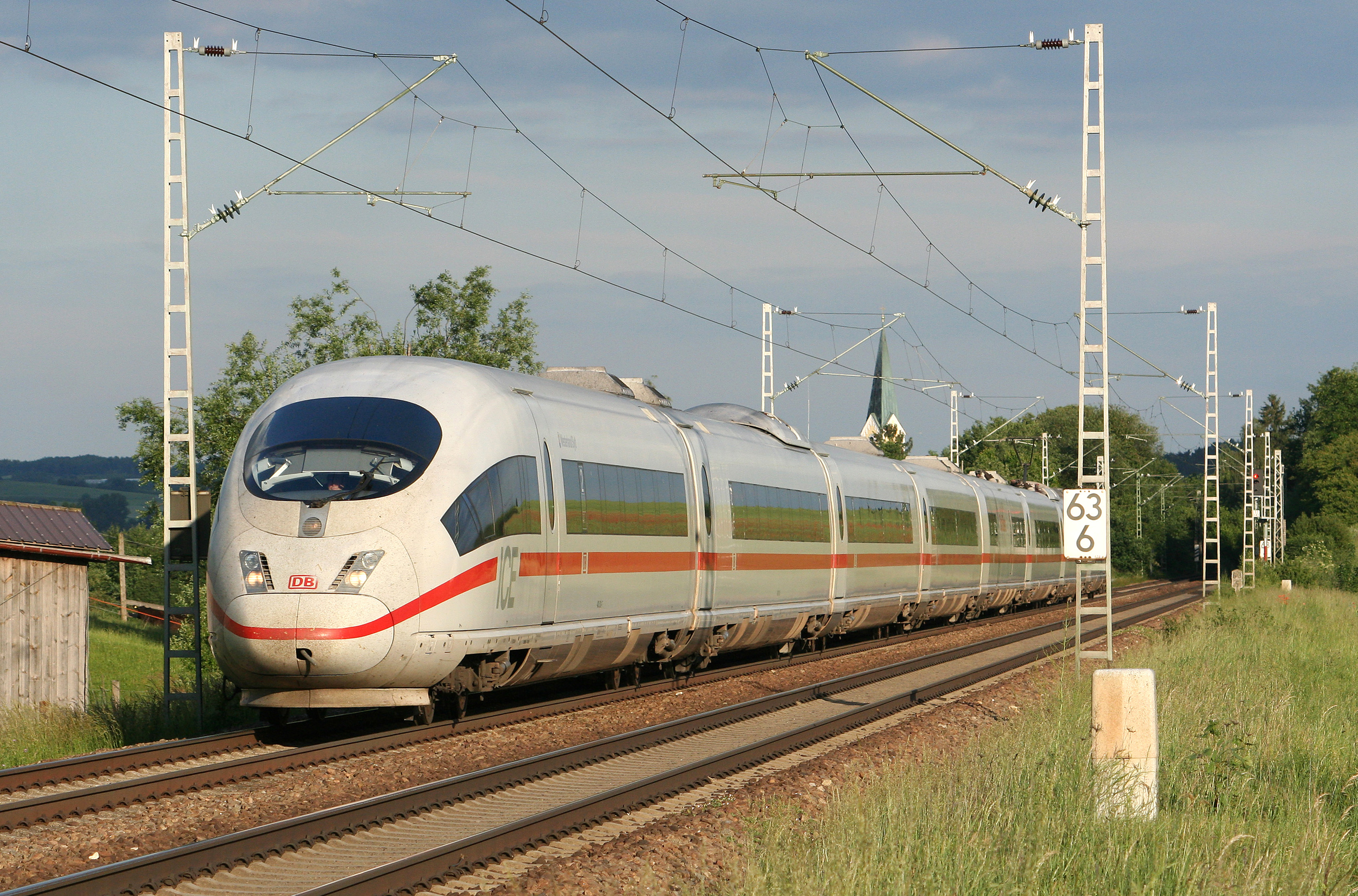
That a train runs on schedule is a sufficient condition for a traveller arriving on time (if one boards the train and it runs on time, then one will arrive on time); but it is not a necessary condition, since there are other ways to travel (if the train does not run to time, one could still arrive on time through other means of transport).

If P is sufficient for Q, then knowing P to be true is adequate grounds to conclude that Q is true; however, knowing P to be false does not meet a minimal need to conclude that Q is false.

The logical relation is, as before, expressed as "if P, then Q" or "P ⇒ Q". This can also be expressed as "P only if Q", "P implies Q" or several other variants. It may be the case that several sufficient conditions, when taken together, constitute a single necessary condition (i.e., individually sufficient and jointly necessary), as illustrated in example 5.

Example 1
"John is a king" implies that John is male. So knowing that John is a king is sufficient to knowing that he is a male.

Example 2
A number's being divisible by 4 is sufficient (but not necessary) for it to be even, but being divisible by 2 is both sufficient and necessary for it to be even.

Example 3
An occurrence of thunder is a sufficient condition for the occurrence of lightning in the sense that hearing thunder, and unambiguously recognizing it as such, justifies concluding that there has been a lightning bolt.

Example 4
If the U.S. Congress passes a bill, the president's signing of the bill is sufficient to make it law. Note that the case whereby the president did not sign the bill, e.g. through exercising a presidential veto, does not mean that the bill has not become a law (for example, it could still have become a law through a congressional override).

Example 5
That the center of a playing card should be marked with a single large spade (♠) is sufficient for the card to be an ace. Three other sufficient conditions are that the center of the card be marked with a single diamond (♦), heart (♥), or club (♣). None of these conditions is necessary to the card's being an ace, but their disjunction is, since no card can be an ace without fulfilling at least (in fact, exactly) one of these conditions.

== Relationship between necessity and sufficiency ==
Being in the purple region is sufficient for being in A, but not necessary. Being in A is necessary for being in the purple region, but not sufficient. Being in A and being in B is necessary and sufficient for being in the purple region.

A condition can be either necessary or sufficient without being the other. For instance, being a mammal (N) is necessary but not sufficient to being human (S), and that a number $x$ is rational (S) is sufficient but not necessary to $x$ being a real number (N) (since there are real numbers that are not rational).

A condition can be both necessary and sufficient. For example, at present, "today is the Fourth of July" is a necessary and sufficient condition for "today is Independence Day in the United States". Similarly, a necessary and sufficient condition for invertibility of a matrix M is that M has a nonzero determinant.

Mathematically speaking, necessity and sufficiency are dual to one another. For any statements S and N, the assertion that "N is necessary for S" is equivalent to the assertion that "S is sufficient for N". Another facet of this duality is that, as illustrated above, conjunctions (using "and") of necessary conditions may achieve sufficiency, while disjunctions (using "or") of sufficient conditions may achieve necessity. For a third facet, identify every mathematical predicate N with the set T(N) of objects, events, or statements for which N holds true; then asserting the necessity of N for S is equivalent to claiming that T(N) is a superset of T(S), while asserting the sufficiency of S for N is equivalent to claiming that T(S) is a subset of T(N).

Psychologically speaking, necessity and sufficiency are both key aspects of the classical view of concepts. Under the classical theory of concepts, how human minds represent a category X, gives rise to a set of individually necessary conditions that define X. Together, these individually necessary conditions are sufficient to be X. This contrasts with the probabilistic theory of concepts which states that no defining feature is necessary or sufficient, rather that categories resemble a family tree structure.

== Simultaneous necessity and sufficiency ==
To say that P is necessary and sufficient for Q is to say two things:

1. that P is necessary for Q, $P \Leftarrow Q$, and that P is sufficient for Q, $P \Rightarrow Q$.
2. equivalently, it may be understood to say that P and Q is necessary for the other, $P \Rightarrow Q \land Q \Rightarrow P$, which can also be stated as each is sufficient for or implies the other.

One may summarize any, and thus all, of these cases by the statement "P if and only if Q", which is denoted by $P \Leftrightarrow Q$, whereas cases tell us that $P \Leftrightarrow Q$ is identical to $P \Rightarrow Q \land Q \Rightarrow P$.

For example, in graph theory a graph G is called bipartite if it is possible to assign to each of its vertices the color black or white in such a way that every edge of G has one endpoint of each color. And for any graph to be bipartite, it is a necessary and sufficient condition that it contain no odd-length cycles. Thus, discovering whether a graph has any odd cycles tells one whether it is bipartite and conversely. A philosopher might characterize this state of affairs thus: "Although the concepts of bipartiteness and absence of odd cycles differ in intension, they have identical extension.

In mathematics, theorems are often stated in the form "P is true if and only if Q is true".

Because, as explained in previous section, necessity of one for the other is equivalent to sufficiency of the other for the first one, e.g. $P \Leftarrow Q$ is equivalent to $Q \Rightarrow P$, if P is necessary and sufficient for Q, then Q is necessary and sufficient for P. We can write $P \Leftrightarrow Q \equiv Q \Leftrightarrow P$ and say that the statements "P is true if and only if Q, is true" and "Q is true if and only if P is true" are equivalent.

== See also ==
- Affirming the consequent
- Biological tests of necessity and sufficiency
- Causality
- Contingency (philosophy)
- Closed concept
- Denying the antecedent
- If and only if
- Material implication (disambiguation)
- Principle of sufficient reason
- Wason selection task
- Modus ponens
- Modus tollens
