= Paul Bartha =

Canadian philosopher

- Born: 1964 (age 61–62)

Education
- Education: University of Pittsburgh (PhD), University of Toronto (BA)

Philosophical work
- Era: 21st-century philosophy
- Region: Western philosophy
- Institutions: University of British Columbia

Paul F. A. Bartha (born 1964) is a Canadian philosopher and Professor and Head of the Department of Philosophy, University of British Columbia. He is known for his works on logical reasoning and analogy.

== Books ==
- By Parallel Reasoning: The Construction and Evaluation of Analogical Arguments (Oxford University Press, 2010)
- Analysis in Vector Spaces, with Mustafa A. Akcoglu and Dzung Minh Ha (Wiley, 2009)
