= Subverted support =

Logical fallacy

Subverted support is a logical fallacy of explanation which attempts to explain something that does not happen.

== Logical form ==
X happens because of Y (when X does not actually happen or exist)

== Exception ==
The fallacy is true if a preceding statement claims that whatever follows is true.
