= Fallacies of illicit transference =

Informal fallacy

A fallacy of illicit transference is an informal fallacy occurring when an argument assumes there is no difference between a term in the distributive (referring to every member of a class) and collective (referring to the class itself as a whole) sense.

There are two variations of this fallacy:

- Fallacy of composition – assumes what is true of the parts is true of the whole. This fallacy is also known as "arguing from the specific to the general."

Since Judy is so diligent in the workplace, this entire company must have an amazing work ethic.

- Fallacy of division – assumes what is true of the whole is true of its parts (or some subset of parts). In statistics, forms of it are usually referred to as the ecological fallacy.

Because this company is so corrupt, so must every employee within it be corrupt.

While fallacious, arguments that make these assumptions may be persuasive because of the representativeness heuristic.

== See also ==
- Affirming the consequent
- Existential fallacy
- Fallacy of the undistributed middle
- Ontogeny recapitulates phylogeny
