= Necessary condition analysis =

Quantitative data analytical technique

Necessary condition analysis (NCA) is a research approach and tool employed to discern "necessary conditions" within datasets. These indispensable conditions stand as pivotal determinants of particular outcomes, wherein the absence of such conditions ensures the absence of the intended result. For example, the admission of a student into a Ph.D. program necessitates a prior degree; the progression of AIDS necessitates the presence of HIV; and organizational change necessitates communication.

The absence these conditions guarantees the outcome cannot occur, and no other condition can overcome the lack of this condition. Further, necessary conditions are not always sufficient. For example, AIDS necessitates HIV, but HIV does not always cause AIDS. In such instances, the condition demonstrates its necessity but lacks sufficiency. NCA seeks to use statistical methods to test for such conditions.

== Overview ==
Traditional statistical methods often emphasize the identification of factors that are sufficient to produce an outcome. In contrast, NCA aims to uncover conditions that must be present for a specific outcome to occur. While researchers will sometimes use NCA as a stand-alone analysis, they often use it to add additional depth to existing analyses of data. For example, NCA acts as stand-alone method or as a complement to other analytical techniques such as regression-based analysis, structural equation modelling, or qualitative comparative analysis, and derivative methods such as PLS-SEM and fsQCA. Thus, scholars using NCA seek to reveal the necessary boundary conditions of causal conditions indicated by these other analytical techniques.

== Methodology ==
NCA allows researchers to analyze how predictor variables constrain the outcome variable by revealing which predictor variables are considered to be necessary, and to what degree they constrain the outcome variable. This is done by evaluating the effect size d of each necessary condition, and examining the statistical significance of the necessary condition (permutation test), and by having theoretical justification for this type of a relationship

Necessary condition analysis follows a step-by-step approach to identify necessary conditions. The key steps involved in conducting NCA are as follows:

1. Formulation of a necessity hypothesis: The first step in NCA is to clearly define the theoretical expectation specifying the condition(s) that may be necessary for the outcome of interest. The outcome could be a specific event, achievement, or outcome that researchers want to understand better.
2. Data collection: Relevant data about the conditions and the outcome are collected as the input to NCA. This data could be obtained through surveys, experiments, observations, or existing datasets, depending on the nature of the research.
3. Identification of necessary conditions: NCA employs specific techniques to identify necessary conditions. These techniques include i) selection of ceiling line(s) in an XY plot and an evaluation of effect size d. ii) Performing a resampling procedure for examining the statistical significance of the necessary condition (permutation test). iii) Examination of the bottleneck table to specify the levels of the condition(s) that are necessary for particular levels of the outcome.
4. Interpretation and validation: Once the necessary conditions are identified, researchers interpret the findings and validate them against existing theories or expert knowledge. This step helps ensure the robustness and reliability of the results.

== Applications ==
Necessary condition analysis has found applications in a wide range of research areas. Some notable applications include:

1. Business and management: NCA is used to identify the essential factors that are necessary for the success of a business, such as effective leadership, customer satisfaction, or employee engagement.
2. Social sciences: In social sciences, NCA helps researchers understand the crucial conditions for various social phenomena, such as educational attainment, poverty reduction, or political stability.
3. Engineering and manufacturing: NCA is employed to identify the minimum requirements for optimal performance or quality in engineering and manufacturing processes. It aids in determining the critical factors that must be met to achieve desired outcomes.

== Limitations ==
Necessary Condition Analysis (NCA) offers a nuanced perspective on data analysis by identifying conditions that must be present for a desired outcome to occur. However, its utility is bounded by several limitations that users must consider. Primarily, NCA's insights are limited by the quality and scope of the data used. If the data does not capture all relevant variables or is biased, the conclusions drawn about necessary conditions may be incomplete or misleading.

Moreover, NCA does not assert sufficiency; a condition deemed necessary might not be enough on its own to guarantee an outcome, necessitating a combination of conditions or further analysis to understand the full causal landscape. This characteristic means that NCA should be employed as part of a broader analytical strategy rather than a standalone method. It is most effective when used to complement other statistical techniques that explore sufficiency or when a clear hypothesis about necessity exists.

NCA's reliance on statistical significance also means it inherits the general limitations of statistical inference, including potential issues with sample size and the risk of overfitting. Consequently, results need to be interpreted with caution and, where possible, validated through additional empirical work or theoretical justification.

In contexts where identifying the bare minimum conditions for an outcome is critical — such as determining the essential factors for business success, key drivers of social phenomena, or minimum requirements in engineering processes — NCA can be valuable. However, its application is less suited to scenarios where the relationships between variables are predominantly sufficiency-based or where the causal dynamics are highly complex and interdependent.

Like other methods, the researcher needs to understand the meaning of the data and bring in the assumptions of the way they understand why thinks work the way they do to formulate relevant hypotheses and meaningful interpretations.
