= Denying the antecedent =

Logical fallacy

Denying the antecedent (also known as denial of the antecedent, inverse error, or fallacy of the inverse) is a formal fallacy of inferring the inverse from an original statement. Phrased another way, denying the antecedent occurs in the context of an indicative conditional statement and assumes that the negation of the antecedent implies the negation of the consequent. It is a type of mixed hypothetical syllogism that takes on the following form:

If P, then Q.
Not P.
Therefore, not Q.

which may also be phrased as

$P \rightarrow Q$ (P implies Q)
$\therefore \neg P \rightarrow \neg Q$ (therefore, not-P implies not-Q)

Arguments of this form are invalid. Informally, this means that arguments of this form do not give good reason to establish their conclusions, even if their premises are true.

The name denying the antecedent derives from the premise "not P", which denies the "if" clause (antecedent) of the conditional premise.

The only situation where one may deny the antecedent would be if the antecedent and consequent represent the same proposition, in which case the argument is trivially valid under the logic of modus tollens.

A related fallacy is affirming the consequent. Two related valid forms of logical arguments include modus ponens (affirming the antecedent) and modus tollens (denying the consequent).

== Examples ==
One way to demonstrate the invalidity of this argument form is with an example that has true premises but an obviously false conclusion. For example:

If you are a ski instructor, then you have a job.
You are not a ski instructor.
Therefore, you have no job.

That argument is intentionally bad, but arguments of the same form can sometimes seem superficially convincing, as in the following example offered by Alan Turing in the article "Computing Machinery and Intelligence":

If each man had a definite set of rules of conduct by which he regulated his life he would be no better than a machine. But there are no such rules, so men cannot be machines.

However, men could still be machines that do not follow a definite set of rules. Thus, this argument (as Turing intends) is invalid.

Conclusions reached by means of this fallacy can yet be correct, especially if derived from true premises, as:

If I am President of the United States, then I can veto Congress.
I am not President.
Therefore, I cannot veto Congress.

The U.S. Constitution indeed grants veto power only to the president. Still, as written, this is a case of the fallacy of denying the antecedent, because it matches the formal symbolic schema at beginning. The form is taken without regard to the content of the language, that is, whether the premises and/or conclusion are true.

== See also ==
- Affirming the consequent
- Modus ponens
- Modus tollens
- Necessity and sufficiency
- Plausible reasoning
