= Legal syllogism =

Form of argument to test if an act is lawful

Legal syllogism is a legal concept concerning the law and its application, specifically a form of argument based on deductive reasoning and seeking to establish whether a specified act is lawful.

A syllogism is a form of logical reasoning that hinges on a question, a major premise, a minor premise and a conclusion. If properly pleaded, every legal action seeking redress of a wrong or enforcement of a right is "a syllogism of which the major premise is the proposition of law involved, the minor premise is the proposition of fact, and the judgment the conclusion." More broadly, many sources suggest that every good legal argument is cast in the form of a syllogism.

Fundamentally, the syllogism may be reduced to a three step process: 1. "law finding", 2. "fact finding", and 3."law applying." See Holding (law). That protocol presupposes someone has done "law making" already. This model is sufficiently broad so that it may be applied in many different nations and legal systems.

In legal theoretic literature, legal syllogism is controversial. It is treated as equivalent to an “interpretational decision.”

== See also ==
- Syllogism
- Case-based reasoning
- Deductive reasoning
- Type of syllogism (disjunctive, hypothetical, legal, poly-, prosleptic, quasi-, statistical)
