= Ampliative =

Term used mainly in logic

Ampliative (from Latin ampliare, "to enlarge"), a term used mainly in logic, meaning "extending" or "adding to that which is already known".

This terminology was often used by medieval logicians in the analyses of the temporal content of their subject terms. There were three rules outlined in its usage:

1. Common terms in a sentence only represent present things when they stand with a non-ampliating verb about the present;
2. A common term standing in a sentence with a verb about the past is able to stand for present and past things; and,
3. The common term standing with a verb about the future can indifferently stand for present and future things.

There are Roman texts that refer to it as ampliatio.

In Norman law, an ampliation was a postponement of a sentence in order to obtain further evidence.

== See also ==
- Supposition
