= Modus tollens =

Rule of logical inference

- Type: Deductive argument form; Rule of inference
- Field: Classical logic; Propositional calculus
- Statement: $P$ implies $Q$. $Q$ is false. Therefore, $P$ must also be false.
- Symbolic statement: $P \rightarrow Q, \neg Q$ $\therefore\neg P$

In propositional logic, modus tollens (/ˈmoʊdəs ˈtɒlɛnz/) (MT), also known as modus tollendo tollens (Latin for "mode that by denying denies") and denying the consequent, is a deductive argument form and a rule of inference. Modus tollens is a mixed hypothetical syllogism that takes the form of "If P, then Q. Not Q. Therefore, not P." It is an application of the general truth that if a statement is true, then so is its contrapositive. The form shows that inference from P implies Q to the negation of Q implies the negation of P is a valid argument.

The history of the inference rule modus tollens goes back to antiquity. The first to explicitly describe the argument form modus tollens was Theophrastus.

Modus tollens is closely related to modus ponens. There are two similar, but invalid, forms of argument: affirming the consequent and denying the antecedent. See also contraposition and proof by contrapositive.

== Explanation ==
The form of a modus tollens argument is a mixed hypothetical syllogism, with two premises and a conclusion:

1. If P, then Q.
2. Not Q.
3. Therefore, not P.

The first premise is a conditional ("if-then") claim, such as P implies Q. The second premise is an assertion that Q, the consequent of the conditional claim, is not the case. From these two premises it can be logically concluded that P, the antecedent of the conditional claim, is also not the case.

For example:

1. If the dog detects an intruder, the dog will bark.
2. The dog did not bark.
3. Therefore, no intruder was detected by the dog.

Supposing that the premises are both true (the dog will bark if it detects an intruder, and does indeed not bark), it logically follows that no intruder has been detected. This is a valid argument since it is not possible for the conclusion to be false if the premises are true. (It is conceivable that there may have been an intruder that the dog did not detect, but that does not invalidate the argument; the first premise is "if the dog detects an intruder". The thing of importance is that the dog detects or does not detect an intruder, not whether there is one.)

Example 1:

1. If I am the burglar, then I can crack a safe.
2. I cannot crack a safe.
3. Therefore, I am not the burglar.

Example 2:

1. If Rex is a chicken, then he is a bird.
2. Rex is not a bird.
3. Therefore, Rex is not a chicken.

== Relation to modus ponens ==
Every use of modus tollens can be converted to a use of modus ponens and one use of contraposition to the premise which is a material implication. For example:

1. If P, then Q. (premise – material implication)
2. If not Q, then not P. (derived by contraposition)
3. Not Q. (premise)
4. Therefore, not P. (derived by modus ponens)

Likewise, every use of modus ponens can be converted to a use of modus tollens and contraposition.

== Formal notation ==
The modus tollens rule can be stated formally as:

$$\frac{P \to Q, \neg Q}{\therefore \neg P}$$

where $P \to Q$ stands for the statement "P implies Q". $\neg Q$ stands for "it is not the case that Q" (or in brief "not Q"). Then, whenever "$P \to Q$" and "$\neg Q$" each appear by themselves as a line of a proof, then "$\neg P$" can validly be placed on a subsequent line.

The modus tollens rule may be written in sequent notation:

$$P\to Q, \neg Q \vdash \neg P$$

where $\vdash$ is a metalogical symbol meaning that $\neg P$ is a syntactic consequence of $P \to Q$ and $\neg Q$ in some logical system;

or as the statement of a functional tautology or theorem of propositional logic:

$$((P \to Q) \land \neg Q) \to \neg P$$

where $P$ and $Q$ are propositions expressed in some formal system;

or including assumptions:

$$\frac{\Gamma \vdash P\to Q ~~~ \Gamma \vdash \neg Q}{\Gamma \vdash \neg P}$$

though since the rule does not change the set of assumptions, this is not strictly necessary.

More complex rewritings involving modus tollens are often seen, for instance in set theory:
$$\begin{align}
P &\subseteq Q \\
x &\notin Q \\
\therefore x&\notin P
\end{align}$$

("P is a subset of Q. x is not in Q. Therefore, x is not in P.")

Also in first-order predicate logic:

$$\forall x:~P(x) \to Q(x)$$
$$\neg Q(y)$$
$$\therefore ~\neg P(y)$$

("For all x if x is P then x is Q. y is not Q. Therefore, y is not P.")

Strictly speaking these are not instances of modus tollens, but they may be derived from modus tollens using a few extra steps.

== Justification via truth table ==
The validity of modus tollens can be clearly demonstrated through a truth table.

p	q	p → q
T	T	T
T	F	F
F	T	T
F	F	T

In instances of modus tollens we assume as premises that p → q is true and q is false. There is only one line of the truth table—the fourth line—which satisfies these two conditions. In this line, p is false. Therefore, in every instance in which p → q is true and q is false, p must also be false.

== Formal proof ==
=== Via disjunctive syllogism ===
Step	Proposition	Derivation
1	$P\rightarrow Q$	Given
2	$\neg Q$	Given
3	$\neg P\lor Q$	Material implication (1)
4	$\neg P$	Disjunctive syllogism (3,2)

=== Via reductio ad absurdum ===
Step	Proposition	Derivation
1	$P\rightarrow Q$	Given
2	$\neg Q$	Given
3	$P$	Assumption
4	$Q$	Modus ponens (1,3)
5	$Q \land \neg Q$	Conjunction introduction (2,4)
6	$\neg P$	Reductio ad absurdum (3,5)

=== Via contraposition ===
Step	Proposition	Derivation
1	$P\rightarrow Q$	Given
2	$\neg Q$	Given
3	$\neg Q\rightarrow \neg P$	Contraposition (1)
4	$\neg P$	Modus ponens (2,3)

== Correspondence to other mathematical frameworks ==
=== Probability calculus ===
Modus tollens represents an instance of the law of total probability combined with Bayes' theorem expressed as:

$$\Pr(P)=\Pr(P\mid Q)\Pr(Q)+\Pr(P\mid \lnot Q)\Pr(\lnot Q)\,,$$

where the conditionals $\Pr(P\mid Q)$ and $\Pr(P\mid \lnot Q)$ are obtained with (the extended form of) Bayes' theorem expressed as:

$$\Pr(P\mid Q) = \frac{\Pr(Q \mid P)\,a(P)}{\Pr(Q\mid P)\,a(P)+\Pr(Q\mid \lnot P)\,a(\lnot P)}\;\;\;$$
and
$$\Pr(P\mid \lnot Q) = \frac{\Pr(\lnot Q \mid P)\,a(P)}{\Pr(\lnot Q\mid P)\,a(P)+\Pr(\lnot Q\mid \lnot P)\,a(\lnot P)}.$$

In the equations above $\Pr(Q)$ denotes the probability of $Q$, and $a(P)$ denotes the base rate (a.k.a. prior probability) of $P$. The conditional probability $\Pr(Q\mid P)$ generalizes the logical statement $P \to Q$, i.e. in addition to assigning TRUE or FALSE we can also assign any probability to the statement. Assume that $\Pr(Q) = 1$ is equivalent to $Q$ being TRUE, and that $\Pr(Q) = 0$ is equivalent to $Q$ being FALSE. It is then easy to see that $\Pr(P) = 0$ when $\Pr(Q\mid P) = 1$ and $\Pr(Q) = 0$. This is because $\Pr(\lnot Q\mid P) = 1 - \Pr(Q\mid P) = 0$ so that $\Pr(P\mid \lnot Q) = 0$ in the last equation. Therefore, the product terms in the first equation always have a zero factor so that $\Pr(P) = 0$ which is equivalent to $P$ being FALSE. Hence, the law of total probability combined with Bayes' theorem represents a generalization of modus tollens.

=== Subjective logic ===
Modus tollens represents an instance of the abduction operator in subjective logic expressed as:

$$\omega^{A}_{P\tilde{\|}Q}= (\omega^{A}_{Q|P},\omega^{A}_{Q|\lnot P})\widetilde{\circledcirc} (a_{P},\,\omega^{A}_{Q})\,,$$

where $\omega^{A}_{Q}$ denotes the subjective opinion about $Q$, and $(\omega^{A}_{Q|P},\omega^{A}_{Q|\lnot P})$ denotes a pair of binomial conditional opinions, as expressed by source $A$. The parameter $a_{P}$ denotes the base rate (a.k.a. the prior probability) of $P$. The abduced marginal opinion on $P$ is denoted $\omega^{A}_{P\tilde{\|}Q}$. The conditional opinion $\omega^{A}_{Q|P}$ generalizes the logical statement $P \to Q$, i.e. in addition to assigning TRUE or FALSE the source $A$ can assign any subjective opinion to the statement. The case where $\omega^{A}_{Q}$ is an absolute TRUE opinion is equivalent to source $A$ saying that $Q$ is TRUE, and the case where $\omega^{A}_{Q}$ is an absolute FALSE opinion is equivalent to source $A$ saying that $Q$ is FALSE. The abduction operator $\widetilde{\circledcirc}$ of subjective logic produces an absolute FALSE abduced opinion $\omega^{A}_{P\widetilde{\|}Q}$ when the conditional opinion $\omega^{A}_{Q|P}$ is absolute TRUE and the consequent opinion $\omega^{A}_{Q}$ is absolute FALSE. Hence, subjective logic abduction represents a generalization of both modus tollens and of the Law of total probability combined with Bayes' theorem.

== See also ==
- Evidence of absence – Relevance fallacy
- Latin phrases
- Modus operandi – Habits of working
- Modus ponens – Rule of logical inference
- Modus vivendi – Arrangement that allows conflicting parties to coexist in peace
- Non sequitur – Faulty deductive reasoning due to a logical flaw
- Performative contradiction – Concept in logic
- Proof by contradiction – Form of proof
- Proof by contrapositive – Mathematical logic concept
- Stoic logic – Ancient philosophy
- Law of excluded middle

== Sources ==
- Audun Jøsang, 2016, Subjective Logic; A formalism for Reasoning Under Uncertainty Springer, Cham, ISBN 978-3-319-42337-1
