= Modus ponens =

Rule of logical inference

- Type: Deductive argument form; Rule of inference
- Field: Classical logic; Propositional calculus
- Statement: $P$ implies $Q$. $P$ is true. Therefore, $Q$ must also be true.
- Symbolic statement: $P \to Q,\; P\; \vdash\ Q$
- First stated by: Theophrastus

In propositional logic, modus ponens (/ˈmoʊdəs ˈpoʊnɛnz/; MP), also known as modus ponendo ponens (from Latin 'mode that by affirming affirms'), conditional elimination, implication elimination, or affirming the antecedent, is a deductive argument form and rule of inference. It can be summarized as "P implies Q. P is true. Therefore, Q must also be true."

Modus ponens is a mixed hypothetical syllogism and is closely related to another valid form of argument, modus tollens. Both have apparently similar but invalid forms: affirming the consequent and denying the antecedent. Constructive dilemma is the disjunctive version of modus ponens.

The history of modus ponens goes back to antiquity. The first to explicitly describe the argument form modus ponens was Theophrastus. It, along with modus tollens, is one of the standard patterns of inference that can be applied to derive chains of conclusions that lead to the desired goal.

== Explanation ==
The form of a modus ponens argument is a mixed hypothetical syllogism, with two premises and a conclusion:

1. If P, then Q.
2. P.
3. Therefore, Q.

The first (major) premise is a conditional ("if–then") claim, namely that P implies Q. The second (minor) premise is an assertion that P, the antecedent of the conditional claim, is the case. From these two premises it can be logically concluded that Q, the consequent of the conditional claim, must be the case as well.

An example of an argument that fits the form modus ponens:

1. If today is Tuesday, then John will go to work.
2. Today is Tuesday.
3. Therefore, John will go to work.

This argument is valid, but this has no bearing on whether any of the statements in the argument are actually true; for modus ponens to be a sound argument, the premises must be true for any true instances of the conclusion. An argument can be valid but nonetheless unsound if one or more premises are false; if an argument is valid and all the premises are true, then the argument is sound. For example, John might be going to work on Wednesday. In this case, the reasoning for John's going to work (because it is Tuesday) is unsound. The argument is only sound on Tuesdays (when John goes to work), but valid on every day of the week. A propositional argument using modus ponens is said to be deductive.

Also, for example, for understanding:

1. $(x)(Px \supset Qx)$
2. $Pa$
3. $Qa$

The first statement represents a general rule that holds for every object x. The second specifies that a particular object a possesses property P. From these two premises, we can logically infer the third statement, namely that object a also possesses property Q.

In single-conclusion sequent calculi, modus ponens is the Cut rule. The cut-elimination theorem for a calculus says that every proof involving Cut can be transformed (generally, by a constructive method) into a proof without Cut, and hence that Cut is admissible.

The Curry–Howard correspondence between proofs and programs relates modus ponens to function application: if f is a function of type P → Q and x is of type P, then f x is of type Q.

In artificial intelligence, modus ponens is often called forward chaining.

== Formal notation ==
p	q	p → q
T	T	T
T	F	F
F	T	T
F	F	T

The modus ponens rule may be written in sequent notation as
$$P \to Q,\; P\;\; \vdash\;\; Q$$

where P, Q and P → Q are statements (or propositions) in a formal language and ⊢ is a metalogical symbol meaning that Q is a syntactic consequence of P and P → Q in some logical system.

In classical two-valued logic, modus ponens can be interpreted from the material conditional (implication) operator. The notion of implication as a rigorous mathematical construct can be traced back to around the turn of the 19th century with early works of mathematical logic, such as Begriffsschrift and Principia Mathematica. Given two variables p and q that can either be true or false, implication (p → q) is defined as all cases being true except where p is true and q is false. By the assumptions of modus ponens, p → q and p are true, and by the definition of implication, it can be deduced that q must also be true.

== Status ==
While modus ponens is one of the most commonly used argument forms in logic, it must not be mistaken for a logical law; rather, it is one of the accepted mechanisms for the construction of deductive proofs that includes the "rule of definition" and the "rule of substitution". Modus ponens allows one to eliminate a conditional statement from a logical proof or argument (the antecedents) and thereby not carry these antecedents forward in an ever-lengthening string of symbols; for this reason modus ponens is sometimes called the rule of detachment or the law of detachment. Enderton, for example, observes that "modus ponens can produce shorter formulas from longer ones", and Russell observes that "the process of the inference cannot be reduced to symbols. Its sole record is the occurrence of ⊦q [the consequent] ... an inference is the dropping of a true premise; it is the dissolution of an implication".

A justification for the "trust in inference is the belief that if the two former assertions [the antecedents] are not in error, the final assertion [the consequent] is not in error". In other words: if one statement or proposition implies a second one, and the first statement or proposition is true, then the second one is also true. If P implies Q and P is true, then Q is true.

== Correspondence to other mathematical frameworks ==
=== Algebraic semantics ===
In mathematical logic, algebraic semantics treats every sentence as a name for an element in an ordered set. Typically, the set can be visualized as a lattice-like structure with a single element (the "always-true") at the top and another single element (the "always-false") at the bottom. Logical equivalence becomes identity, so that when $\neg{(P \wedge Q)}$ and $\neg{P} \vee \neg{Q}$, for instance, are equivalent (as is standard), then $\neg{(P \wedge Q)} = \neg{P} \vee \neg{Q}$. Logical implication becomes a matter of relative position: $P$ logically implies $Q$ just in case $P \leq Q$, i.e., when either $P = Q$ or else $P$ lies below $Q$ and is connected to it by an upward path.

In this context, to say that $P$ and $P \rightarrow Q$ together imply $Q$—that is, to affirm modus ponens as valid—is to say that the highest point which lies below both $P$ and $P \rightarrow Q$ lies below $Q$, i.e., that $P \wedge (P \rightarrow Q) \leq Q$. (Note: The highest point that lies below both $X$ and $Y$ is the "meet" of $X$ and $Y$, denoted by $X \wedge Y$.) In the semantics for basic propositional logic, the algebra is Boolean, with $\rightarrow$ construed as the material conditional: $P \rightarrow Q = \neg{P} \vee Q$. Confirming that $P \wedge (P \rightarrow Q) \leq Q$ is then straightforward, because $P \wedge (P \rightarrow Q) = P \wedge Q$ and $P \wedge Q \leq Q$. With other treatments of $\rightarrow$, the semantics becomes more complex, the algebra may be non-Boolean, and the validity of modus ponens cannot be taken for granted.

=== Probability calculus ===
If $\Pr(P \rightarrow Q) = x$ and $\Pr(P) = y$, then $\Pr(Q)$ must lie in the interval $[x + y - 1, x]$. (Note: Assuming $P \rightarrow Q = \neg{P} \vee Q$, that is. Since $\neg P$ then implies $P \rightarrow Q$, $x$ must always be greater than or equal to $1 - y$, and therefore $x+y-1$ will be greater than or equal to $0$. And since $y$ must always be less than or equal to $1$, $x+y-1$ must always be less than or equal to $x$.) For the special case $x = y = 1$, $\Pr(Q)$ must equal $1$.

=== Subjective logic ===
Modus ponens represents an instance of the binomial deduction operator in subjective logic expressed as:

$$\omega^{A}_{Q\|P} = (\omega^{A}_{Q|P},\omega^{A}_{Q|\lnot P})\circledcirc \omega^{A}_{P}\,,$$

where $\omega^{A}_{P}$ denotes the subjective opinion about $P$ as expressed by source $A$, and the conditional opinion $\omega^{A}_{Q|P}$ generalizes the logical implication $P \to Q$. The deduced marginal opinion about $Q$ is denoted by $\omega^{A}_{Q\|P}$. The case where $\omega^{A}_{P}$ is an absolute TRUE opinion about $P$ is equivalent to source $A$ saying that $P$ is TRUE, and the case where $\omega^{A}_{P}$ is an absolute FALSE opinion about $P$ is equivalent to source $A$ saying that $P$ is FALSE. The deduction operator $\circledcirc$ of subjective logic produces an absolute TRUE deduced opinion $\omega^{A}_{Q\|P}$ when the conditional opinion $\omega^{A}_{Q|P}$ is absolute TRUE and the antecedent opinion $\omega^{A}_{P}$ is absolute TRUE. Hence, subjective logic deduction represents a generalization of both modus ponens and the Law of total probability.

== Alleged cases of failure ==
Philosophers and linguists have identified a variety of cases where modus ponens appears to fail. Vann McGee, for instance, argued that modus ponens can fail for conditionals whose consequents are themselves conditionals. The following is an example:

1. Either Shakespeare or Hobbes wrote Hamlet.
2. If either Shakespeare or Hobbes wrote Hamlet, then if Shakespeare did not do it, Hobbes did.
3. Therefore, if Shakespeare did not write Hamlet, Hobbes did it.

Since Shakespeare did write Hamlet, the first premise is true. The second premise is also true, since starting with a set of possible authors limited to just Shakespeare and Hobbes and eliminating one of them leaves only the other. However, the conclusion is doubtful, since ruling out Shakespeare as the author of Hamlet would leave numerous possible candidates, many of them more plausible alternatives than Hobbes (if the if-thens in the inference are read as material conditionals, the conclusion comes out true simply by virtue of the false antecedent. This is one of the paradoxes of material implication).

The general form of McGee-type counterexamples to modus ponens is simply $P, P \rightarrow (Q \rightarrow R)$, therefore, $Q \rightarrow R$; however, it is not essential that $P$ be a disjunction, as in the example given. That these kinds of cases constitute failures of modus ponens remains a controversial view among logicians, but opinions vary on how the cases should be disposed of, and some authors have rejected McGee's argument.

In deontic logic, some examples of conditional obligation also raise the possibility of modus ponens failure. These are cases where the conditional premise describes an obligation predicated on an immoral or imprudent action, e.g., "If Doe murders his mother, he ought to do so gently," for which the dubious unconditional conclusion would be "Doe ought to gently murder his mother." It would appear to follow that if Doe is in fact gently murdering his mother, then by modus ponens it appears that he is doing exactly what he should, unconditionally, be doing. Here again, modus ponens' failure is not a popular diagnosis and is criticized by some authors, but is sometimes argued for.

== Possible fallacies ==
The fallacy of affirming the consequent (inferring P from if P, then Q and Q) is a common misinterpretation of the modus ponens.

== See also ==
- Condensed detachment – Method in formal logic
- Import-export (logic) – Principle of classical logic
- Latin phrases
- Modus tollens – Rule of logical inference
- Modus vivendi – Arrangement that allows conflicting parties to coexist in peace
- Stoic logic – Ancient philosophy
- What the Tortoise Said to Achilles – 1895 allegorical dialogue by Lewis Carroll

== Sources ==
- Herbert B. Enderton, 2001, A Mathematical Introduction to Logic Second Edition, Harcourt Academic Press, Burlington MA, ISBN 978-0-12-238452-3.
- Audun Jøsang, 2016, Subjective Logic; A formalism for Reasoning Under Uncertainty Springer, Cham, ISBN 978-3-319-42337-1
- Alfred North Whitehead and Bertrand Russell 1927 Principia Mathematica to *56 (Second Edition) paperback edition 1962, Cambridge at the University Press, London UK. No ISBN, no LCCCN.
- Alfred Tarski 1946 Introduction to Logic and to the Methodology of the Deductive Sciences 2nd Edition, reprinted by Dover Publications, Mineola NY. ISBN 0-486-28462-X (pbk).
