= Antecedent (logic) =

First half of an hypothetic statement (in logic)

An antecedent is the first half of a hypothetical proposition, whenever the if-clause precedes the then-clause. In some contexts the antecedent is called the protasis.

Examples:

- If $P$, then $Q$.

This is a nonlogical formulation of a hypothetical proposition. In this case, the antecedent is P, and the consequent is Q. In the implication "$\phi$ implies $\psi$", $\phi$ is called the antecedent and $\psi$ is called the consequent. Antecedent and consequent are connected via logical connective to form a proposition.

- If $X$ is a man, then $X$ is mortal.

"$X$ is a man" is the antecedent for this proposition while "$X$ is mortal" is the consequent of the proposition.

- If men have walked on the Moon, then I am the king of France.

Here, "men have walked on the Moon" is the antecedent and "I am the king of France" is the consequent.

Let $y=x+1$.

- If $x=1$ then $y=2$.

"$x=1$" is the antecedent and "$y=2$" is the consequent of this hypothetical proposition.

== See also ==
- Consequent
- Affirming the consequent (fallacy)
- Denying the antecedent (fallacy)
- Necessity and sufficiency
