= Formal fallacy =

Faulty deductive reasoning due to a logical flaw

In logic and philosophy, a formal fallacy (Note: Also known as a deductive fallacy, logical fallacy, or a non sequitur (/ˌnɒn ˈsɛkwɪtər/; Latin for 'it does not follow').) is a pattern of reasoning with a flaw in its logical structure (the logical relationship between the premises and the conclusion). A formal fallacy is contrasted with an informal fallacy. A formal fallacy must have an invalid logical form and thus be unsound. An informal fallacy, however, may have a valid logical form and yet be unsound because one or more premises are false. An argument can be both a formal fallacy and an informal fallacy. In everyday conversation, the term logical fallacy usually refers to a formal fallacy.

== About the term non sequitur ==
The term is Latin for "it does not follow". Different authors have different meanings and uses for this term in logic.
Possible meanings:

1. While "the logical argument is a non sequitur" is synonymous with "the logical argument is invalid", the term non sequitur typically refers to those types of invalid arguments which do not constitute formal fallacies covered by particular terms (e.g., affirming the consequent). In other words, in practice, "non sequitur" refers to an unnamed formal fallacy.
2. Non sequitur can simply be a synonym for logical fallacy, be it formal or informal.
3. The Internet Encyclopedia of Philosophy in an article signed by Bradley Dowden defines non sequitur in a more narrower sense as a specific type of fallacy:

When a conclusion is supported only by extremely weak reasons or by irrelevant reasons, the argument is fallacious and is said to be a Non Sequitur. However, we usually apply the term only when we cannot think of how to label the argument with a more specific fallacy name. Any deductively invalid inference is a non sequitur if it also very weak when assessed by inductive standards.

Example: Nuclear disarmament is a risk, but everything in life involves a risk. Every time you drive in a car you are taking a risk. If you’re willing to drive in a car, you should be willing to have disarmament.

The following is not an example: “If she committed the murder, then there’d be his blood stains on her hands. His blood stains are on her hands. So, she committed the murder.” This deductively invalid argument uses the Fallacy of Affirming the Consequent, but it isn’t a non sequitur because it has significant inductive strength.

— Bradley Dowden, Internet Encyclopedia of Philosophy

== Related concept ==
Propositional logic is concerned with the meanings of sentences and the relationships between them. It focuses on the role of logical operators, called propositional connectives, in determining whether a sentence is true. An error in the sequence will result in a deductive argument that is invalid. The argument itself could have true premises, but still have a false conclusion. Thus, a formal fallacy is a fallacy in which deduction goes wrong, and is no longer a logical process. This may not affect the truth of the conclusion, since validity and truth are separate in formal logic.

== Common examples ==
Euler diagram showing how axioms of "most animals in this zoo are birds" and "most birds can fly" need not mean that "most animals in this zoo can fly"

In the strictest sense, a logical fallacy is the incorrect application of a valid logical principle or an application of a nonexistent principle, such as reasoning that:

1. Most animals in this zoo are birds.
2. Most birds can fly.
3. Therefore, most animals in this zoo can fly.

This is fallacious: a zoo could have a large proportion of flightless birds. There is no logical principle that states:

1. For some x, P(x).
2. For some x, Q(x).
3. Therefore, for some x, P(x) and Q(x).

An easy way to show the above inference as invalid is by using Euler diagrams. In logical parlance, the inference is invalid, since under at least one interpretation of the predicates it is not validity preserving.

People often have difficulty applying the rules of logic. For example, a person may say the following syllogism is valid, when in fact it is not:

1. All birds have beaks.
2. That creature has a beak.
3. Therefore, that creature is a bird.

"That creature" may well be a bird, but the conclusion does not follow from the premises. Certain other animals also have beaks, such as turtles. Errors of this type occur because people reverse a premise. In this case, "All birds have beaks" is converted to "All beaked creatures are birds." The reversed premise is plausible because few people are aware of any instances of beaked creatures besides birds—but this premise is not the one that was given. In this way, the deductive fallacy is formed by points that may individually appear logical, but when placed together are shown to be incorrect.

== Special example ==
A special case is a mathematical fallacy, an intentionally invalid mathematical proof, often with the error subtle and somehow concealed. Mathematical fallacies are typically crafted and exhibited for educational purposes, usually taking the form of spurious proofs of obvious contradictions.

== Non Sequitur fallacy ==
In everyday speech, a non sequitur is a statement in which the final part is totally unrelated to the first part, for example:

Life is life and fun is fun, but it's all so quiet when the goldfish die.

— West with the Night, Beryl Markham

== See also ==
- List of fallacies
- Apophasis – Stating something by saying the opposite
- Cognitive bias – Systematic pattern of deviation from norm or rationality in judgment
- Demagogue – Politician or orator who panders to fears and emotions of the public
- Fallacies of definition – Ways in which a term may be poorly defined
- False statement – Statement contradicted by facts and reality
- Mathematical fallacy, also known as Invalid proof – Certain type of mistaken proof
- Modus tollens – Rule of logical inference
- Münchhausen trilemma – Thought experiment used to demonstrate the impossibility of proving any truth
- Paradox – Logically self-contradictory statement
- Relevance logic – Kind of non-classical logic
- Scientific misconceptions – False beliefs about science
- Sophist – Teachers of 5th century BC Greece
- Soundness – Term in logic and deductive reasoning
- Subverted support – Logical fallacy of explanation
