= Affirming the consequent =

Type of fallacious argument (logical fallacy)

In propositional logic, affirming the consequent (also known as converse error, fallacy of the converse, or confusion of necessity and sufficiency) is a formal fallacy (or an invalid form of argument) that is committed when, in the context of an indicative conditional statement, it is stated that because the consequent is true, therefore the antecedent is true. It takes on the following form:

1. If P, then Q.
2. Q.
3. Therefore, P.

which may also be phrased as

1. $P \rightarrow Q$ (P implies Q)
2. $\therefore Q \rightarrow P$ (therefore, Q implies P)

For example, it may be true that a broken lamp would cause a room to become dark. It is not true, however, that a dark room implies the presence of a broken lamp. There may be no lamp (or any light source), or the lamp might be functional but switched off. In other words, the consequent (a dark room) can have other antecedents (no lamp, off-lamp), and so can still be true even if the stated antecedent is not.

Converse errors are common in everyday thinking and communication and can result from, among other causes, communication issues, misconceptions about logic, and failure to consider other causes.

A related fallacy is denying the antecedent. Two related valid forms of logical argument include modus tollens (denying the consequent) and modus ponens (affirming the antecedent).

== Formal description ==
Affirming the consequent is the action of taking a true statement $P \to Q$ and invalidly concluding its converse $Q \to P$. The name affirming the consequent derives from using the consequent, Q, of $P \to Q$, to conclude the antecedent P. This fallacy can be summarized formally as $(P \to Q, Q)\to P$ or, alternatively, $\frac{P \to Q, Q}{\therefore P}$. The root cause of such a logical error is sometimes failure to realize that just because P is a possible condition for Q, P may not be the only condition for Q, i.e., Q may follow from another condition as well.

Affirming the consequent can also result from overgeneralizing the experience of many statements having true converses. If P and Q are "equivalent" statements, i.e., $P \leftrightarrow Q$, it is possible to infer P under the condition Q. For example, the statements "It is August 13, so it is my birthday" $P \to Q$ and "It is my birthday, so it is August 13" $Q \to P$ are equivalent and both true consequences of the statement "August 13 is my birthday" (an abbreviated form of $P \leftrightarrow Q$).

Of the possible forms of "mixed hypothetical syllogisms", two are valid and two are invalid. Affirming the antecedent (modus ponens) and denying the consequent (modus tollens) are valid. Affirming the consequent and denying the antecedent are invalid.

== Additional examples ==
Example 1

One way to demonstrate the invalidity of this argument form is with a counterexample with true premises but an obviously false conclusion. For example:

1. If someone lives in San Diego, then they live in California.
2. Joe lives in California.
3. Therefore, Joe lives in San Diego.

There are many places to live in California other than San Diego. On the other hand, one can affirm with certainty that "if someone does not live in California" (non-Q), then "this person does not live in San Diego" (non-P). This is the contrapositive of the first statement, and it must be true if and only if the original statement is true.

Example 2

1. If an animal is a dog, then it has four legs.
2. My cat has four legs.
3. Therefore, my cat is a dog.

Here, it is immediately intuitive that any number of other antecedents ("If an animal is a deer...", "If an animal is an elephant...", "If an animal is a moose...", etc.) can give rise to the consequent ("then it has four legs"), and that it is preposterous to suppose that having four legs must imply that the animal is a dog and nothing else. This is useful as a teaching example since most people can immediately recognize that the conclusion reached must be wrong (intuitively, a cat cannot be a dog), and that the method by which it was reached must therefore be fallacious. This argument was featured in Eugène Ionesco's Rhinoceros in a conversation between a Logician and an Old Gentleman.

Example 3

In Catch-22, the chaplain is interrogated for supposedly being "Washington Irving"/"Irving Washington", who has been blocking out large portions of soldiers' letters home. The colonel has found such a letter, but with the chaplain's name signed.

1. "You can read, though, can't you?" the colonel persevered sarcastically. "The author signed his name."
2. "That's my name there."
3. "Then you wrote it. Q.E.D."

P in this case is 'The chaplain signs his own name', and Q 'The chaplain's name is written'. The chaplain's name may be written, but he did not necessarily write it, as the colonel falsely concludes.

== See also ==
- Abductive reasoning
- Appeal to consequences
- Confusion of the inverse
- Denying the antecedent
- Fallacies of illicit transference
- Fallacy of the single cause
- Fallacy of the undistributed middle
- Modus ponens
- Modus tollens
- Necessity and sufficiency
- Post hoc ergo propter hoc
