= List of rules of inference =

This is a list of rules of inference, logical laws that relate to mathematical formulae.

== Introduction ==
Rules of inference are syntactical transform rules which one can use to infer a conclusion from a premise to create an argument. A set of rules can be used to infer any valid conclusion if it is complete, while never inferring an invalid conclusion, if it is sound. A sound and complete set of rules need not include every rule in the following list, as many of the rules are redundant, and can be proven with the other rules.

Discharge rules permit inference from a subderivation based on a temporary assumption. Below, the notation

$$\varphi \vdash \psi$$

indicates such a subderivation from the temporary assumption $\varphi$ to $\psi$.

== Rules for propositional calculus ==
=== Rules for negations ===
Reductio ad absurdum (or Negation Introduction)
$$\varphi \vdash \psi$$
$$\underline{\varphi \vdash \lnot \psi}$$
$$\lnot \varphi$$

Reductio ad absurdum (related to the law of excluded middle)
$$\lnot \varphi \vdash \psi$$
$$\underline{\lnot \varphi \vdash \lnot \psi}$$
$$\varphi$$

Ex contradictione quodlibet
$$\varphi$$
$$\underline{\lnot \varphi}$$
$$\psi$$

=== Rules for conditionals ===
Deduction theorem (or Conditional Introduction)
$$\underline{\varphi \vdash \psi}$$
$$\varphi \rightarrow \psi$$

Modus ponens (a type of Conditional Elimination)
$$\varphi \rightarrow \psi$$
$$\underline{\varphi \quad \quad \quad}$$
$$\psi$$

Modus tollens (a type of Conditional Elimination)
$$\varphi \rightarrow \psi$$
$$\underline{\lnot \psi \quad \quad \quad}$$
$$\lnot \varphi$$

=== Rules for conjunctions ===
Adjunction (or Conjunction Introduction)

$$\varphi$$
$$\underline{\psi \quad \quad \ \ }$$
$$\varphi \land \psi$$

Simplification (or Conjunction Elimination)

$$\underline{\varphi \land \psi}$$
$$\varphi$$

$$\underline{\varphi \land \psi}$$
$$\psi$$

=== Rules for disjunctions ===
Addition (or Disjunction Introduction)
$$\underline{\varphi \quad \quad \ \ }$$
$$\varphi \lor \psi$$

$$\underline{\psi \quad \quad \ \ }$$
$$\varphi \lor \psi$$

Case analysis (or Proof by Cases or Argument by Cases or Disjunction elimination)
$$\varphi \rightarrow \chi$$
$$\psi \rightarrow \chi$$
$$\underline{\varphi \lor \psi}$$
$$\chi$$

Disjunctive syllogism
$$\varphi \lor \psi$$
$$\underline{\lnot \varphi \quad \quad}$$
$$\psi$$

$$\varphi \lor \psi$$
$$\underline{\lnot \psi \quad \quad}$$
$$\varphi$$

Constructive dilemma
$$\varphi \rightarrow \chi$$
$$\psi \rightarrow \xi$$
$$\underline{\varphi \lor \psi}$$
$$\chi \lor \xi$$

=== Rules for biconditionals ===
Biconditional introduction
$$\varphi \rightarrow \psi$$
$$\underline{\psi \rightarrow \varphi}$$
$$\varphi \leftrightarrow \psi$$

Biconditional elimination
$$\varphi \leftrightarrow \psi$$
$$\underline{\varphi \quad \quad}$$
$$\psi$$

$$\varphi \leftrightarrow \psi$$
$$\underline{\psi \quad \quad}$$
$$\varphi$$

$$\varphi \leftrightarrow \psi$$
$$\underline{\lnot \varphi \quad \quad}$$
$$\lnot \psi$$

$$\varphi \leftrightarrow \psi$$
$$\underline{\lnot \psi \quad \quad}$$
$$\lnot \varphi$$

$$\varphi \leftrightarrow \psi$$
$$\underline{\psi \lor \varphi}$$
$$\psi \land \varphi$$

$$\varphi \leftrightarrow \psi$$
$$\underline{\lnot \psi \lor \lnot \varphi}$$
$$\lnot \psi \land \lnot \varphi$$

== Rules of classical predicate calculus ==
In the following rules, $\varphi(\beta / \alpha)$ is exactly like $\varphi$ except for having the term $\beta$ wherever $\varphi$ has the free variable $\alpha$.

Universal Generalization (or Universal Introduction)
$$\underline{\varphi{(\beta / \alpha)}}$$
$$\forall \alpha\, \varphi$$

Restriction 1: $\beta$ is a variable which does not occur in $\varphi$.
Restriction 2: $\beta$ is not mentioned in any hypothesis or undischarged assumptions.

Universal Instantiation (or Universal Elimination)
$$\forall \alpha\, \varphi$$
$$\overline{\varphi{(\beta / \alpha)}}$$

Restriction: No free occurrence of $\alpha$ in $\varphi$ falls within the scope of a quantifier quantifying a variable occurring in $\beta$.

Existential Generalization (or Existential Introduction)
$$\underline{\varphi(\beta / \alpha)}$$
$$\exists \alpha\, \varphi$$

Restriction: No free occurrence of $\alpha$ in $\varphi$ falls within the scope of a quantifier quantifying a variable occurring in $\beta$.

Existential Instantiation (or Existential Elimination)
$$\exists \alpha\, \varphi$$
$$\underline{\varphi(\beta / \alpha) \vdash \psi}$$
$$\psi$$

Restriction 1: $\beta$ is a variable which does not occur in $\varphi$.
Restriction 2: There is no occurrence, free or bound, of $\beta$ in $\psi$.
Restriction 3: $\beta$ is not mentioned in any hypothesis or undischarged assumptions.

== Rules of substructural logic ==
The following are special cases of universal generalization and existential elimination; these occur in substructural logics, such as linear logic.

Rule of weakening (or monotonicity of entailment) (aka no-cloning theorem)

$$\alpha\vdash\beta$$
$$\overline{\alpha,\alpha\vdash\beta}$$

Rule of contraction (or idempotency of entailment) (aka no-deleting theorem)

$$\underline{\alpha,\alpha,\gamma\vdash\beta}$$
$$\alpha,\gamma\vdash\beta$$

== Table: Rules of Inference ==
The rules above can be summed up in the following table. The "Tautology" column shows how to interpret the notation of a given rule.

Rules of inference	Tautology	Name
$$\begin{align} p\\ p \rightarrow q\\ \therefore \overline{q \quad \quad \quad} \\ \end{align}$$	$(p \wedge (p \rightarrow q)) \rightarrow q$	Modus ponens
$$\begin{align} \neg q\\ p \rightarrow q\\ \therefore \overline{\neg p \quad \quad \quad} \\ \end{align}$$	$(\neg q \wedge (p \rightarrow q)) \rightarrow \neg p$	Modus tollens
$$\begin{align} p \rightarrow q\\ q \rightarrow r\\ \therefore \overline{p \rightarrow r} \\ \end{align}$$	$((p \rightarrow q) \wedge (q \rightarrow r)) \rightarrow (p \rightarrow r)$	Hypothetical syllogism
$$\begin{align} p \rightarrow q\\ \therefore \overline{p \rightarrow (p \wedge q)} \\ \end{align}$$	$(p \rightarrow q) \rightarrow (p \rightarrow (p \wedge q))$	Absorption
$$\begin{align} p\\ q\\ \therefore \overline{p \wedge q} \\ \end{align}$$	$((p) \wedge (q)) \rightarrow (p \wedge q)$	Conjunction introduction
$$\begin{align} p \wedge q \\ \therefore \overline{p \quad \quad \quad} \\ \end{align}$$	$(p \wedge q) \rightarrow p$	Conjunction elimination
$$\begin{align} p \\ \therefore \overline{p \vee q} \\ \end{align}$$	$p \rightarrow (p \vee q)$	Disjunction introduction
$$\begin{align} p \rightarrow q\\ r \rightarrow q\\ p \vee r\\ \therefore \overline{q \quad \quad \quad} \\ \end{align}$$	$((p \rightarrow q) \wedge (r \rightarrow q) \wedge (p \vee r)) \rightarrow q$	Disjunction elimination
$$\begin{align} p \vee q \\ \neg p \\ \therefore \overline{q \quad \quad \quad} \\ \end{align}$$	$((p \vee q) \wedge \neg p) \rightarrow q$	Disjunctive syllogism
$$\begin{align} p \vee p \\ \therefore \overline{p \quad \quad \quad} \\ \end{align}$$	$(p \vee p) \rightarrow p$	Disjunctive simplification
$$\begin{align} p \vee q \\ \neg p \vee r \\ \therefore \overline{q \vee r} \\ \end{align}$$	$((p \vee q) \wedge (\neg p \vee r)) \rightarrow (q \vee r)$	Resolution
$$\begin{align} p \rightarrow q\\ q \rightarrow p\\ \therefore \overline{p \leftrightarrow q} \\ \end{align}$$	$((p \rightarrow q) \wedge (q \rightarrow p)) \rightarrow (p \leftrightarrow q)$	Biconditional introduction

All rules use the basic logic operators. A complete table of "logic operators" is shown by a truth table, giving definitions of all the possible (16) truth functions of 2 boolean variables (p, q):

p	q	0	1	2	3	4	5	6	7	8	9	10	11	12	13	14	15
T	T	F	F	F	F	F	F	F	F	T	T	T	T	T	T	T	T
T	F	F	F	F	F	T	T	T	T	F	F	F	F	T	T	T	T
F	T	F	F	T	T	F	F	T	T	F	F	T	T	F	F	T	T
F	F	F	T	F	T	F	T	F	T	F	T	F	T	F	T	F	T

where T = true and F = false, and, the columns are the logical operators:

- 0, false, Contradiction;
- 1, NOR, Logical NOR (Peirce's arrow);
- 2, Converse nonimplication;
- 3, ¬p, Negation;
- 4, Material nonimplication;
- 5, ¬q, Negation;
- 6, XOR, Exclusive disjunction;
- 7, NAND, Logical NAND (Sheffer stroke);
- 8, AND, Logical conjunction;
- 9, XNOR, If and only if, Logical biconditional;
- 10, q, Projection function;
- 11, if/then, Material conditional;
- 12, p, Projection function;
- 13, then/if, Converse implication;
- 14, OR, Logical disjunction;
- 15, true, Tautology.

Each logic operator can be used in an assertion about variables and operations, showing a basic rule of inference. Examples:

- The column-14 operator (OR), shows Addition rule: when p=T (the hypothesis selects the first two lines of the table), we see (at column-14) that p∨q=T.
  We can see also that, with the same premise, another conclusions are valid: columns 12, 14 and 15 are T.
- The column-8 operator (AND), shows Simplification rule: when p∧q=T (first line of the table), we see that p=T.
  With this premise, we also conclude that q=T, p∨q=T, etc. as shown by columns 9–15.
- The column-11 operator (IF/THEN), shows Modus ponens rule: when p→q=T and p=T only one line of the truth table (the first) satisfies these two conditions. On this line, q is also true. Therefore, whenever p → q is true and p is true, q must also be true.

Machines and well-trained people use this look at table approach to do basic inferences, and to check if other inferences (for the same premises) can be obtained.

=== Example 1 ===
Consider the following assumptions: "If it rains today, then we will not go on a canoe today. If we do not go on a canoe trip today, then we will go on a canoe trip tomorrow. Therefore (Mathematical symbol for "therefore" is $\therefore$), if it rains today, we will go on a canoe trip tomorrow". To make use of the rules of inference in the above table we let $p$ be the proposition "If it rains today", $q$ be "We will not go on a canoe today" and let $r$ be "We will go on a canoe trip tomorrow". Then this argument is of the form:

$$\begin{align}
p \rightarrow q\\
q \rightarrow r\\
\therefore \overline{p \rightarrow r} \\
\end{align}$$

=== Example 2 ===
Consider a more complex set of assumptions: "It is not sunny today and it is colder than yesterday". "We will go swimming only if it is sunny", "If we do not go swimming, then we will have a barbecue", and "If we will have a barbecue, then we will be home by sunset" lead to the conclusion "We will be home by sunset." Proof by rules of inference: Let $p$ be the proposition "It is sunny today", $q$ the proposition "It is colder than yesterday", $r$ the proposition "We will go swimming", $s$ the proposition "We will have a barbecue", and $t$ the proposition "We will be home by sunset". Then the hypotheses become $\neg p \wedge q, r \rightarrow p, \neg r \rightarrow s$ and $s \rightarrow t$. Using our intuition we conjecture that the conclusion might be $t$. Using the Rules of Inference table we can prove the conjecture easily:

Step	Reason
1.$\neg p \wedge q$	Hypothesis
2. $\neg p$	Simplification using Step 1
3. $r \rightarrow p$	Hypothesis
4. $\neg r$	Modus tollens using Step 2 and 3
5. $\neg r \rightarrow s$	Hypothesis
6. $s$	Modus ponens using Step 4 and 5
7. $s \rightarrow t$	Hypothesis
8. $t$	Modus ponens using Step 6 and 7

== See also ==
- List of logic systems
- Modus ponendo tollens
