= Biconditional introduction =

Inference in propositional logic

- Type: Rule of inference
- Field: Propositional calculus
- Statement: If $P \to Q$ is true, and if $Q \to P$ is true, then one may infer that $P \leftrightarrow Q$ is true.
- Symbolic statement: $\frac{P \to Q, Q \to P}{\therefore P \leftrightarrow Q}$

In propositional logic, biconditional introduction is a valid rule of inference. It allows for one to infer a biconditional from two conditional statements. The rule makes it possible to introduce a biconditional statement into a logical proof. If $P \to Q$ is true, and if $Q \to P$ is true, then one may infer that $P \leftrightarrow Q$ is true. For example, from the statements "if I'm breathing, then I'm alive" and "if I'm alive, then I'm breathing", it can be inferred that "I'm breathing if and only if I'm alive". Biconditional introduction is the converse of biconditional elimination. The rule can be stated formally as:

$$\frac{P \to Q, Q \to P}{\therefore P \leftrightarrow Q}$$

where the rule is that wherever instances of "$P \to Q$" and "$Q \to P$" appear on lines of a proof, "$P \leftrightarrow Q$" can validly be placed on a subsequent line.

== Formal notation ==
The biconditional introduction rule may be written in sequent notation:
$$(P \to Q), (Q \to P) \vdash (P \leftrightarrow Q)$$

where $\vdash$ is a metalogical symbol meaning that $P \leftrightarrow Q$ is a syntactic consequence when $P \to Q$ and $Q \to P$ are both in a proof;

or as the statement of a truth-functional tautology or theorem of propositional logic:

$$((P \to Q) \land (Q \to P)) \to (P \leftrightarrow Q)$$

where $P$, and $Q$ are propositions expressed in some formal system.
