= Absorption (logic) =

- Type: Rule of inference
- Field: Propositional calculus
- Statement: If $P$ implies $Q$, then $P$ implies $P$ and $Q$.
- Symbolic statement: $\frac{P \to Q}{\therefore P \to (P \land Q)}$

Absorption is a valid argument form and rule of inference of propositional logic. The rule states that if $P$ implies $Q$, then $P$ implies $P$ and $Q$. The rule makes it possible to introduce conjunctions to proofs. It is called the law of absorption because the term $Q$ is "absorbed" by the term $P$ in the consequent. The rule can be stated:
$$\frac{P \to Q}{\therefore P \to (P \land Q)}$$
where the rule is that wherever an instance of "$P \to Q$" appears on a line of a proof, "$P \to (P \land Q)$" can be placed on a subsequent line.

== Formal notation ==
The absorption rule may be expressed as a sequent:
$$P \to Q \vdash P \to (P \land Q)$$
where $\vdash$ is a metalogical symbol meaning that $P \to (P \land Q)$ is a syntactic consequence of $(P \rightarrow Q)$ in some logical system;

and expressed as a truth-functional tautology or theorem of propositional logic. The principle was stated as a theorem of propositional logic by Russell and Whitehead in Principia Mathematica as:
$$(P \to Q) \leftrightarrow (P \to (P \land Q))$$
where $P$, and $Q$ are propositions expressed in some formal system.

== Examples ==
If it will rain, then I will wear my coat.
Therefore, if it will rain then it will rain and I will wear my coat.

== Proof by truth table ==
$P$	$Q$	$P\rightarrow Q$	$P\rightarrow (P\land Q)$
T	T	T	T
T	F	F	F
F	T	T	T
F	F	T	T

== Formal proof ==
Proposition	Derivation
$P\rightarrow Q$	Given
$\neg P\lor Q$	Material implication
$\neg P\lor P$	Law of Excluded Middle
$(\neg P\lor P)\land (\neg P\lor Q)$	Conjunction
$\neg P\lor(P\land Q)$	Reverse Distribution
$P\rightarrow (P\land Q)$	Material implication

== See also ==
- Absorption law
