= Disjunctive syllogism =

Logical rule of inference

- Type: Rule of inference
- Field: Propositional calculus
- Statement: If $P$ is true or $Q$ is true, and $P$ is false, then $Q$ is true.
- Symbolic statement: $\frac{P \lor Q, \neg P}{\therefore Q}$

In classical logic, disjunctive syllogism (historically known as modus tollendo ponens (MTP), Latin for "mode that affirms by denying") is a valid argument form which is a syllogism having a disjunctive statement for one of its premises.

An example in English:

1. I will choose soup or I will choose salad.
2. I will not choose soup.
3. Therefore, I will choose salad.

== Propositional logic ==
In propositional logic, disjunctive syllogism (also known as disjunction elimination and or elimination, or abbreviated ∨E), is a valid rule of inference. If it is known that at least one of two statements is true, and that it is not the former that is true; we can infer that it has to be the latter that is true. Equivalently, if P is true or Q is true and P is false, then Q is true. The name "disjunctive syllogism" derives from its being a syllogism, a three-step argument, and the use of a logical disjunction (any "or" statement.) For example, "P or Q" is a disjunction, where P and Q are called the statement's disjuncts. The rule makes it possible to eliminate a disjunction from a logical proof. It is the rule that
$$\frac{P \lor Q, \neg P}{\therefore Q}$$
where the rule is that whenever instances of "$P \lor Q$", and "$\neg P$" appear on lines of a proof, "$Q$" can be placed on a subsequent line.

Disjunctive syllogism is closely related and similar to hypothetical syllogism, which is another rule of inference involving a syllogism. It is also related to the law of noncontradiction, one of the three traditional laws of thought.

== Formal notation ==
For a logical system that validates it, the disjunctive syllogism may be written in sequent notation as
$$P \lor Q, \lnot P \vdash Q$$
where $\vdash$ is a metalogical symbol meaning that $Q$ is a syntactic consequence of $P \lor Q$, and $\lnot P$.

It may be expressed as a truth-functional tautology or theorem in the object language of propositional logic as
$$((P \lor Q) \land \neg P) \to Q$$
where $P$, and $Q$ are propositions expressed in some formal system.

== Natural language examples ==
Here is an example:

1. It is red or it is blue.
2. It is not blue.
3. Therefore, it is red.

Here is another example:

1. The breach is a safety violation, or it is not subject to fines.
2. The breach is not a safety violation.
3. Therefore, it is not subject to fines.

== Strong form ==
Modus tollendo ponens can be made stronger by using exclusive disjunction instead of inclusive disjunction as a premise:
$$\frac{P \underline\lor Q, \neg P}{\therefore Q}$$

== Related argument forms ==
Unlike modus ponens and modus ponendo tollens, with which it should not be confused, disjunctive syllogism is often not made an explicit rule or axiom of logical systems, as the above arguments can be proven with a combination of reductio ad absurdum and disjunction elimination.

Other forms of syllogism include:

- hypothetical syllogism
- categorical syllogism

Disjunctive syllogism holds in classical propositional logic and intuitionistic logic, but not in some paraconsistent logics.

== See also ==
- Stoic logic
- Types of syllogism
