= Existential quantification =

Mathematical use of "there exists"

- Type: Quantifier
- Field: Mathematical logic
- Statement: $\exists xP(x)$ is true when $P(x)$ is true for at least one value of $x$.
- Symbolic statement: $\exists xP(x)$

In predicate logic, an existential quantification is a type of quantifier which asserts the existence of an object with a given property. It is usually denoted by the logical operator symbol ∃, which, when used together with a predicate variable, is called an existential quantifier ("∃x" or "∃(x)" or "(∃x)"), read as "there exists", "there is at least one", or "for some". Existential quantification is distinct from universal quantification ("for all"), which asserts that the property or relation holds for all members of the domain. Some sources use the term existentialization to refer to existential quantification.

Quantification in general is covered in the article on quantification (logic). The existential quantifier is encoded as U+2203 ∃ THERE EXISTS in Unicode, and as \exists in LaTeX and related formula editors.

== Basics ==
Consider the formal sentence

For some natural number $n$, $n\times n=25$.

This is a single statement using existential quantification. It is roughly analogous to the informal sentence "Either $0\times 0=25$, or $1\times 1=25$, or $2\times 2=25$, or... and so on," but more precise, because it doesn't need us to infer the meaning of the phrase "and so on." (In particular, the sentence explicitly specifies its domain of discourse to be the natural numbers, not, for example, the real numbers.)

This particular example is true, because 5 is a natural number, and when we substitute 5 for n, we produce the true statement $5\times 5=25$. It does not matter that "$n\times n=25$" is true only for that single natural number, 5; the existence of a single solution is enough to prove this existential quantification to be true.

In contrast, "For some even number $n$, $n\times n=25$" is false, because there are no even solutions. The domain of discourse, which specifies the values the variable n is allowed to take, is therefore critical to a statement's trueness or falseness. Logical conjunctions are used to restrict the domain of discourse to fulfill a given predicate. For example, the sentence

For some positive odd number $n$, $n\times n=25$

is logically equivalent to the sentence

For some natural number $n$, $n$ is odd and $n\times n=25$.

The mathematical proof of an existential statement about "some" object may be achieved either by a constructive proof, which exhibits an object satisfying the "some" statement, or by a nonconstructive proof, which shows that there must be such an object without concretely exhibiting one.

=== Notation ===
In symbolic logic, "∃" (a turned letter "E" in a sans-serif font, Unicode U+2203) is used to indicate existential quantification. For example, the notation $\exists{n}{\in}\mathbb{N}: n\times n=25$ represents the (true) statement

There exists some $n$ in the set of natural numbers such that $n\times n=25$.

The symbol's first usage is thought to be by Giuseppe Peano in Formulario mathematico (1896). Afterwards, Bertrand Russell popularised its use as the existential quantifier. Through his research in set theory, Peano also introduced the symbols $\cap$ and $\cup$ to respectively denote the intersection and union of sets.

== Properties ==
=== Negation ===
A quantified propositional function is a statement; thus, like statements, quantified functions can be negated. The $\lnot\$ symbol is used to denote negation.

For example, if P(x) is the predicate "x is greater than 0 and less than 1", then, for a domain of discourse X of all natural numbers, the existential quantification "There exists a natural number x which is greater than 0 and less than 1" can be symbolically stated as:

$$\exists{x}{\in}\mathbf{X}\, P(x)$$

This can be demonstrated to be false. Truthfully, it must be said, "It is not the case that there is a natural number x that is greater than 0 and less than 1", or, symbolically:

$$\lnot\ \exists{x}{\in}\mathbf{X}\, P(x)$$.

If there is no element of the domain of discourse for which the statement is true, then it must be false for all of those elements. That is, the negation of

$$\exists{x}{\in}\mathbf{X}\, P(x)$$

is logically equivalent to "For any natural number x, x is not greater than 0 and less than 1", or:

$$\forall{x}{\in}\mathbf{X}\, \lnot P(x)$$

Generally, then, the negation of a propositional function's existential quantification is a universal quantification of that propositional function's negation; symbolically,

$$\lnot\ \exists{x}{\in}\mathbf{X}\, P(x) \equiv\ \forall{x}{\in}\mathbf{X}\, \lnot P(x)$$

(This is a generalization of De Morgan's laws to predicate logic.)

A common error is stating "all persons are not married" (i.e., "there exists no person who is married"), when "not all persons are married" (i.e., "there exists a person who is not married") is intended:

$$\lnot\ \exists{x}{\in}\mathbf{X}\, P(x) \equiv\ \forall{x}{\in}\mathbf{X}\, \lnot P(x) \not\equiv\ \lnot\ \forall{x}{\in}\mathbf{X}\, P(x) \equiv\ \exists{x}{\in}\mathbf{X}\, \lnot P(x)$$

Negation is also expressible through a statement of "for no", as opposed to "for some":

$$\nexists{x}{\in}\mathbf{X}\, P(x) \equiv \lnot\ \exists{x}{\in}\mathbf{X}\, P(x)$$

Unlike the universal quantifier, the existential quantifier distributes over logical disjunctions:

$\exists{x}{\in}\mathbf{X}\, P(x) \lor Q(x) \to\ (\exists{x}{\in}\mathbf{X}\, P(x) \lor \exists{x}{\in}\mathbf{X}\, Q(x))$

=== Rules of inference ===
A rule of inference is a rule justifying a logical step from hypothesis to conclusion. There are several rules of inference which utilize the existential quantifier.

Existential introduction (∃I) concludes that, if the propositional function is known to be true for a particular element of the domain of discourse, then it must be true that there exists an element for which the proposition function is true. Symbolically,

$$P(a) \to\ \exists{x}{\in}\mathbf{X}\, P(x)$$

Existential instantiation, when conducted in a Fitch style deduction, proceeds by entering a new sub-derivation while substituting an existentially quantified variable for a subject—which does not appear within any active sub-derivation. If a conclusion can be reached within this sub-derivation in which the substituted subject does not appear, then one can exit that sub-derivation with that conclusion. The reasoning behind existential elimination (∃E) is as follows: If it is given that there exists an element for which the proposition function is true, and if a conclusion can be reached by giving that element an arbitrary name, that conclusion is necessarily true, as long as it does not contain the name. Symbolically, for an arbitrary c and for a proposition Q in which c does not appear:

$$\exists{x}{\in}\mathbf{X}\, P(x) \to\ ((P(c) \to\ Q) \to\ Q)$$

$P(c) \to\ Q$ must be true for all values of c over the same domain X; else, the logic does not follow: If c is not arbitrary, and is instead a specific element of the domain of discourse, then stating P(c) might unjustifiably give more information about that object.

=== The empty set ===
The formula $\exists {x}{\in}\varnothing \, P(x)$ is always false, regardless of P(x). This is because $\varnothing$ denotes the empty set, and no x of any description – let alone an x fulfilling a given predicate P(x) – exist in the empty set. See also Vacuous truth for more information.

== As adjoint ==
In category theory and the theory of elementary topoi, the existential quantifier can be understood as the left adjoint of a functor between power sets, the inverse image functor of a function between sets; likewise, the universal quantifier is the right adjoint.

== See also ==
- Existential clause
- Existence theorem
- First-order logic
- Lindström quantifier
- List of logic symbols – for the unicode symbol ∃
- Quantifier variance
- Uniqueness quantification
