= Conjunction introduction =

Rule of inference in propositional logic

- Type: Rule of inference
- Field: Propositional calculus
- Statement: If the proposition $P$ is true, and the proposition $Q$ is true, then the logical conjunction of the two propositions $P$ and $Q$ is true.
- Symbolic statement: $\frac{P,Q}{\therefore P \land Q}$

Conjunction introduction (often abbreviated simply as conjunction and also called and introduction or adjunction) is a valid rule of inference of propositional logic. The rule makes it possible to introduce a conjunction into a logical proof. It is the inference that if the proposition $P$ is true, and the proposition $Q$ is true, then the logical conjunction of the two propositions $P$ and $Q$ is true. For example, if it is true that "it is raining", and it is true that "the cat is inside", then it is true that "it is raining and the cat is inside". The rule can be stated:

$$\frac{P,Q}{\therefore P \land Q}$$

where the rule is that wherever an instance of "$P$" and "$Q$" appear on lines of a proof, a "$P \land Q$" can be placed on a subsequent line.

== Formal notation ==
The conjunction introduction rule may be written in sequent notation:

$$P, Q \vdash P \land Q$$

where $P$ and $Q$ are propositions expressed in some formal system, and $\vdash$ is a metalogical symbol meaning that $P \land Q$ is a syntactic consequence if $P$ and $Q$ are each on lines of a proof in some logical system.
