= Addition (disambiguation) =

Addition is the mathematical process of putting things together.

Addition may also refer to:

- Addition (logic), a simple logic argument form
- Addition reaction, a chemical reaction combining molecules
- "Addition", a song by No Devotion from Permanence
- A room or wing added onto a building after initial construction through renovation.
