= Instancing =

Instancing may refer to:

- Geometry instancing, a technique used in realtime rendering
- Dungeon instancing, a technique used in online games to provide individual players or groups of players with their own instance of some sort of content at the same time

== See also ==
- Instantiation (disambiguation)
