= Disjunction elimination =

Rule of inference of propositional logic

- Type: Rule of inference
- Field: Propositional calculus
- Statement: If a statement $P$ implies a statement $Q$ and a statement $R$ also implies $Q$, then if either $P$ or $R$ is true, then $Q$ has to be true.
- Symbolic statement: $$\begin{aligned} 1.\quad & P \to Q \\ 2.\quad & R \to Q \\ 3.\quad & P \lor R \\ \therefore\quad & Q \end{aligned}$$

In propositional logic, disjunction elimination (sometimes named proof by cases, case analysis, or or elimination) is the valid argument form and rule of inference that allows one to eliminate a disjunctive statement from a logical proof. It is the inference that if a statement $P$ implies a statement $Q$ and a statement $R$ also implies $Q$, then if either $P$ or $R$ is true, then $Q$ has to be true. The reasoning is simple: since at least one of the statements P and R is true, and since either of them would be sufficient to entail Q, Q is certainly true.

An example in English:

1. If I'm inside, I have my wallet on me.
2. If I'm outside, I have my wallet on me.
3. It is true that either I'm inside or I'm outside.
4. Therefore, I have my wallet on me.

It is the rule can be stated as:

$$\begin{aligned}
1.\quad & P \to Q \\
2.\quad & R \to Q \\
3.\quad & P \lor R \\
\therefore\quad & Q
\end{aligned}$$

where the rule is that whenever instances of "$P \to Q$", and "$R \to Q$" and "$P \lor R$" appear on lines of a proof, "$Q$" can be placed on a subsequent line.

== Formal notation ==
The disjunction elimination rule may be written in sequent notation:

$$(P \to Q), (R \to Q), (P \lor R) \vdash Q$$

where $\vdash$ is a metalogical symbol meaning that $Q$ is a syntactic consequence of $P \to Q$, and $R \to Q$ and $P \lor R$ in some logical system;

and expressed as a truth-functional tautology or theorem of propositional logic:

$$(((P \to Q) \land (R \to Q)) \land (P \lor R)) \to Q$$

where $P$, $Q$, and $R$ are propositions expressed in some formal system.

== See also ==
- Disjunction
- Argument in the alternative
- Disjunct normal form
- Proof by exhaustion
