= Disjunction introduction =

Inference introducing a disjunction in logical proofs

- Type: Rule of inference
- Field: Propositional calculus
- Statement: If $P$ is true, then $P$ or $Q$ must be true.
- Symbolic statement: $\frac{P}{\therefore P \lor Q}$

Disjunction introduction or addition (also called or introduction) is a rule of inference of propositional logic and almost every other deduction system. The rule makes it possible to introduce disjunctions to logical proofs. It is the inference that if P is true, then P or Q must be true.

An example in English:

1. Socrates is a man.
2. Therefore, Socrates is a man or pigs are flying in formation over the English Channel.

The rule can be expressed as:
$$\frac{P}{\therefore P \lor Q}$$
where the rule is that whenever instances of "$P$" appear on lines of a proof, "$P \lor Q$" can be placed on a subsequent line.

More generally it's also a simple valid argument form, this means that if the premise is true, then the conclusion is also true as any rule of inference should be, and an immediate inference, as it has a single proposition in its premises.

Disjunction introduction is not a rule in some paraconsistent logics because in combination with other rules of logic, it leads to explosion (i.e. everything becomes provable) and paraconsistent logic tries to avoid explosion and to be able to reason with contradictions. One of the solutions is to introduce disjunction with over rules. See Paraconsistent logic § Tradeoffs.

== Formal notation ==
The disjunction introduction rule may be written in sequent notation:

$$P \vdash (P \lor Q)$$

where $\vdash$ is a metalogical symbol meaning that $P \lor Q$ is a syntactic consequence of $P$ in some logical system;

and expressed as a truth-functional tautology or theorem of propositional logic:

$$P \to (P \lor Q)$$

where $P$ and $Q$ are propositions expressed in some formal system.
