= Instantiation =

Instantiation or instance may refer to:

== Philosophy ==
- A modern concept similar to participation in classical Platonism; see the theory of forms
- The instantiation principle, the idea that in order for a property to exist, it must be had by some object or substance; the instance being a specific object rather than the idea of it
- Universal instantiation
- An instance (predicate logic), a statement produced by applying universal instantiation to a universal statement
- Existential fallacy, also called existential instantiation
- A substitution instance, a formula of mathematical logic that can be produced by substituting certain strings of symbols for others in formula, also can be used as the mathematical order to represent the data in an algorithm

== Computing ==
- Instance (computer science), referring to any running process or to an object as an instance of a class
- Table instance (or database instance), a concept in database design; see Row (database)
- Creation of an object (a location in memory having a value and possibly referenced by an identifier)
- Instance can refer to a single virtual machine in a virtualized or cloud computing environment that provides operating-system-level virtualization

== Other uses ==
- Instance dungeon, a feature of many online videogames
- Instantiation of a class or object within the organization of a body of knowledge
- Cline of instantiation, a concept in systemic functional linguistics.
- Instance (knowledge representation), a member of a class
- Instantiation (collection), a collection of short stories by Greg Egan
