= Conjunction elimination =

Inference rule in logic

- Type: Rule of inference
- Field: Propositional calculus
- Statement: If the conjunction $A$ and $B$ is true, then $A$ is true, and $B$ is true.
- Symbolic statement: 1. $\frac{P \land Q}{\therefore P}, \frac{P \land Q}{\therefore Q}$; 2. $(P \land Q) \vdash P, (P \land Q) \vdash Q$; 3. $(P \land Q) \to P,(P \land Q) \to Q$

In propositional logic, conjunction elimination (also called and elimination, ∧ elimination, or simplification) is a valid immediate inference, argument form and rule of inference which makes the inference that, if the conjunction A and B is true, then A is true, and B is true. The rule makes it possible to shorten longer proofs by deriving one of the conjuncts of a conjunction on a line by itself.

An example in English:

1. It's raining and it's pouring.
2. Therefore it's raining.

The rule consists of two separate sub-rules, which can be expressed in formal language as:
$$\frac{P \land Q}{\therefore P}$$
and
$$\frac{P \land Q}{\therefore Q}$$

The two sub-rules together mean that, whenever an instance of "$P \land Q$" appears on a line of a proof, either "$P$" or "$Q$" can be placed on a subsequent line by itself. The above example in English is an application of the first sub-rule.

== Formal notation ==
The conjunction elimination sub-rules may be written in sequent notation:

$$(P \land Q) \vdash P$$
and
$$(P \land Q) \vdash Q$$

where $\vdash$ is a metalogical symbol meaning that $P$ is a syntactic consequence of $P \land Q$ and $Q$ is also a syntactic consequence of $P \land Q$ in logical system;

and expressed as truth-functional tautologies or theorems of propositional logic:

$$(P \land Q) \to P$$
and
$$(P \land Q) \to Q$$

where $P$ and $Q$ are propositions expressed in some formal system.
