= Negation introduction =

Logical rule of inference

- Type: Rule of inference
- Field: Propositional calculus
- Statement: If a given antecedent implies both the consequent and its complement, then the antecedent is a contradiction.
- Symbolic statement: $(P \rightarrow Q) \land (P \rightarrow \neg Q) \rightarrow \neg P$

Negation introduction is a rule of inference, or transformation rule, in the field of propositional calculus.

Negation introduction states that if a given antecedent implies both the consequent and its complement, then this implies the negated antecedent.

== Formal notation ==
This can be written as:
$$\Big((P \rightarrow Q) \land (P \rightarrow \neg Q)\Big) \rightarrow \neg P$$

An example of its use would be an attempt to prove two contradictory statements from a single fact. For example, if a person were to state "Whenever I hear the phone ringing I am happy" and then state "Whenever I hear the phone ringing I am not happy", one can infer that the person never hears the phone ringing.

Many proofs by contradiction use negation introduction as reasoning scheme: to prove ¬P, assume for contradiction P, then derive from it two contradictory inferences Q and ¬Q. Since the latter contradiction renders P impossible, ¬P must hold.

== Proof ==
With $\neg P$ identified as $P\to\bot$, the principle is as a special case of Frege's theorem, already in minimal logic.

Another derivation makes use of $A\to \neg B$ as the curried, equivalent form of $\neg (A \land B)$. Using this twice, the principle is seen equivalent to the negation of $\big(P\land(P\to Q)\big)\land \neg(P\and Q)$ which, via modus ponens and rules for conjunctions, is itself equivalent to the valid noncontradiction principle for $P\and Q$.

A classical derivation passing through the introduction of a disjunction may be given as follows:

Step	Proposition	Derivation
1	$(P \to Q)\land(P \to \neg Q)$	Given
2	$(\neg P \lor Q)\land(\neg P \lor \neg Q)$	Classical equivalence of the material implication
3	$\neg P \lor (Q \land \neg Q)$	Distributivity
4	$\neg P \lor \bot$	Law of noncontradiction for $Q$
5	$\neg P$	Disjunctive syllogism (3,4)

== See also ==
- Reductio ad absurdum
