= Existential generalization =

Rule of inference in predicate logic

- Type: Rule of inference
- Field: Predicate logic
- Statement: There exists a member $x$ in a universal set with a property of $Q$
- Symbolic statement: $Q(a) \to\ \exists{x}\, Q(x) ,$

In predicate logic, existential generalization (also known as existential introduction, ∃I) is a valid rule of inference that allows one to move from a specific statement, or one instance, to a quantified generalized statement, or existential proposition. In first-order logic, it is often used as a rule for the existential quantifier ($\exists$) in formal proofs.

Example: "Rover loves to wag his tail. Therefore, something loves to wag its tail."

Example: "Alice made herself a cup of tea. Therefore, Alice made someone a cup of tea."

Example: "Alice made herself a cup of tea. Therefore, someone made someone a cup of tea."

In the Fitch-style calculus:
$$Q(a) \to\ \exists{x}\, Q(x) ,$$
where $Q(a)$ is obtained from $Q(x)$ by replacing all its free occurrences of $x$ (or some of them) by $a$.

== Quine ==
According to Willard Van Orman Quine, universal instantiation and existential generalization are two aspects of a single principle, for instead of saying that $\forall x \, x=x$ implies $\text{Socrates}=\text{Socrates}$, we could as well say that the denial $\text{Socrates} \ne \text{Socrates}$ implies $\exists x \, x \ne x$. The principle embodied in these two operations is the link between quantifications and the singular statements that are related to them as instances. Yet it is a principle only by courtesy. It holds only in the case where a term names and, furthermore, occurs referentially.

== See also ==
- Existential instantiation
- List of rules of inference
- Universal generalization
