= Dictum de omni et nullo =

In Aristotelian logic, dictum de omni et nullo (Latin: "the maxim of all and none") is the principle that whatever is affirmed or denied of a whole kind K may be affirmed or denied (respectively) of any subkind of K. This principle is fundamental to syllogistic logic in the sense that all valid syllogistic argument forms are reducible to applications of the two constituent principles dictum de omni and dictum de nullo.

== Dictum de omni ==
Dictum de omni (sometimes misinterpreted as universal instantiation) is the principle that whatever is universally affirmed of a kind is affirmable as well for any subkind of that kind.
Example:

(1) Dogs are mammals.
(2) Mammals have livers.
Therefore (3) dogs have livers.

Premise (1) states that "dog" is a subkind of the kind "mammal".
Premise (2) is a (universal affirmative) claim about the kind "mammal".
Statement (3) concludes that what is true of the kind "mammal" is true of the subkind "dog".

== Dictum de nullo ==
Dictum de nullo is the related principle that whatever is denied of a kind is likewise denied of any subkind of that kind.
Example:

(1) Dogs are mammals.
(4) Mammals do not have gills.
Therefore (5) dogs do not have gills.

Premise (1) states that "dog" is a subkind of the kind "mammal".
Premise (4) is a (universal negative) claim about the kind "mammal".
Statement (5) concludes that what is denied of the kind "mammal" is denied of the subkind "dog".

== Discussion ==
In Aristotelian syllogistic, these two principles correspond respectively to the two argument forms, Barbara and Celarent.

These principles correspond roughly to a valid argument form known as universal hypothetical syllogism in first-order predicate logic. Nevertheless, Aristotelian syllogistic does not employ the formal machinery of first-order quantification. This by itself accounts for why it is incorrect to identify Dictum de omni as universal instantiation. The latter mistake is more easily explained by the fact that universal instantiation is a single-premise form of deduction that is not even a syllogism.

== See also ==
- Aristotle
- Syllogism
- Term logic
- Class (philosophy)
- Class (set theory)
- Natural kind
- Type (metaphysics)
- Downward entailing
- Monotonic function
