= Modus ponendo tollens =

Logical rule of inference

Modus ponendo tollens (MPT; Latin: "mode that denies by affirming") is a valid rule of inference for propositional logic. It is closely related to modus ponens and modus tollendo ponens.

== Overview ==
MPT is usually described as having the form:

1. Not both A and B
2. A
3. Therefore, not B

For example:

1. Ann and Bill cannot both win the race.
2. Ann won the race.
3. Therefore, Bill cannot have won the race.

As E. J. Lemmon describes it: "Modus ponendo tollens is the principle that, if the negation of a conjunction holds and also one of its conjuncts, then the negation of its other conjunct holds."

In logic notation this can be represented as:

1. $\neg (A \land B)$
2. $A$
3. $\therefore \neg B$

Based on the Sheffer Stroke (alternative denial), "|", the inference can also be formalized in this way:

1. $A\,|\,B$
2. $A$
3. $\therefore \neg B$

== Proof ==
Step	Proposition	Derivation
1	$\neg (A \land B)$	Given
2	$A$	Given
3	$\neg A \lor \neg B$	De Morgan's laws (1)
4	$\neg \neg A$	Double negation (2)
5	$\neg B$	Disjunctive syllogism (3,4)

== Strong form ==
Modus ponendo tollens can be made stronger by using exclusive disjunction instead of non-conjunction as a premise:

1. $A \underline\lor B$
2. $A$
3. $\therefore \neg B$

== See also ==
- Modus tollendo ponens
- Stoic logic
