= Biconditional elimination =

Inference in propositional logic

- Type: Rule of inference
- Field: Propositional calculus
- Statement: If $P \leftrightarrow Q$ is true, then one may infer that $P \to Q$ is true, and also that $Q \to P$ is true.
- Symbolic statement: $\frac{P \leftrightarrow Q}{\therefore P \to Q}$; $\frac{P \leftrightarrow Q}{\therefore Q \to P}$

Biconditional elimination is the name of two valid rules of inference of propositional logic. It allows for one to infer a conditional from a biconditional. If $P \leftrightarrow Q$ is true, then one may infer that $P \to Q$ is true, and also that $Q \to P$ is true. For example, if it's true that I'm breathing if and only if I'm alive, then it's true that if I'm breathing, I'm alive; likewise, it's true that if I'm alive, I'm breathing. The rules can be stated formally as:
$$\frac{P \leftrightarrow Q}{\therefore P \to Q}$$
and
$$\frac{P \leftrightarrow Q}{\therefore Q \to P}$$
where the rule is that wherever an instance of "$P \leftrightarrow Q$" appears on a line of a proof, either "$P \to Q$" or "$Q \to P$" can be placed on a subsequent line.

== Formal notation ==
The biconditional elimination rule may be written in sequent notation:
$$(P \leftrightarrow Q) \vdash (P \to Q)$$
and
$$(P \leftrightarrow Q) \vdash (Q \to P)$$

where $\vdash$ is a metalogical symbol meaning that $P \to Q$, in the first case, and $Q \to P$ in the other are syntactic consequences of $P \leftrightarrow Q$ in some logical system;

or as the statement of a truth-functional tautology or theorem of propositional logic:
$$\begin{align}
(P \leftrightarrow Q) &\to (P \to Q) \\
(P \leftrightarrow Q) &\to (Q \to P)
\end{align}$$
where $P$, and $Q$ are propositions expressed in some formal system.

== See also ==
- Logical biconditional
