= Universal generalization =

Rule of inference in predicate logic

- Type: Rule of inference
- Field: Predicate logic
- Statement: Suppose $P$ is true of any arbitrarily selected $p$, then $P$ is true of everything.
- Symbolic statement: $\vdash \!P(x)$, $\vdash \!\forall x \, P(x)$

In predicate logic, generalization (also universal generalization, universal introduction, GEN, UG) is a valid inference rule. It states that if $\vdash \!P(x)$ has been derived, then $\vdash \!\forall x \, P(x)$ can be derived.

== Generalization with hypotheses ==
The full generalization rule allows for hypotheses to the left of the turnstile, but with restrictions. Assume $\Gamma$ is a set of formulas, $\varphi$ a formula, and $\Gamma \vdash \varphi(y)$ has been derived. The generalization rule states that $\Gamma \vdash \forall x \, \varphi(x)$ can be derived if $y$ is not mentioned in $\Gamma$ and $x$ does not occur in $\varphi$.

These restrictions are necessary for soundness. Without the first restriction, one could conclude $\forall x P(x)$ from the hypothesis $P(y)$. Without the second restriction, one could make the following deduction:

1. $\exists z \, \exists w \, ( z \not = w)$ (Hypothesis)
2. $\exists w \, (y \not = w)$ (Existential instantiation)
3. $y \not = x$ (Existential instantiation)
4. $\forall x \, (x \not = x)$ (Faulty universal generalization)

This purports to show that $\exists z \, \exists w \, ( z \not = w) \vdash \forall x \, (x \not = x),$ which is an unsound deduction. Note that $\Gamma \vdash \forall y \, \varphi(y)$ is permissible if $y$ is not mentioned in $\Gamma$ (the second restriction need not apply, as the semantic structure of $\varphi(y)$ is not being changed by the substitution of any variables).

== Example of a proof ==
Prove: $\forall x \, (P(x) \rightarrow Q(x)) \rightarrow (\forall x \, P(x) \rightarrow \forall x \, Q(x))$ is derivable from $\forall x \, (P(x) \rightarrow Q(x))$ and $\forall x \, P(x)$.

Proof:

Step	Formula	Justification
1	$\forall x \, (P(x) \rightarrow Q(x))$	Hypothesis
2	$\forall x \, P(x)$	Hypothesis
3	$(\forall x \, (P(x) \rightarrow Q(x))) \rightarrow (P(y) \rightarrow Q(y))$	From (1) by Universal instantiation
4	$P(y) \rightarrow Q(y)$	From (1) and (3) by Modus ponens
5	$(\forall x \, P(x)) \rightarrow P(y)$	From (2) by Universal instantiation
6	$P(y) \$	From (2) and (5) by Modus ponens
7	$Q(y) \$	From (6) and (4) by Modus ponens
8	$\forall x \, Q(x)$	From (7) by Generalization
9	$\forall x \, (P(x) \rightarrow Q(x)), \forall x \, P(x) \vdash \forall x \, Q(x)$	Summary of (1) through (8)
10	$\forall x \, (P(x) \rightarrow Q(x)) \vdash \forall x \, P(x) \rightarrow \forall x \, Q(x)$	From (9) by Deduction theorem
11	$\vdash \forall x \, (P(x) \rightarrow Q(x)) \rightarrow (\forall x \, P(x) \rightarrow \forall x \, Q(x))$	From (10) by Deduction theorem

In this proof, universal generalization was used in step 8. The deduction theorem was applicable in steps 10 and 11 because the formulas being moved have no free variables.

== See also ==
- First-order logic
- Hasty generalization
- Universal instantiation
- Existential generalization
