= Universal instantiation =

Rule of inference in predicate logic

- Type: Rule of inference
- Field: Predicate logic
- Symbolic statement: $\forall x \, A \Rightarrow A\{x \mapsto t\}$

In predicate logic, universal instantiation (UI; also called universal specification or universal elimination, and sometimes confused with dictum de omni) is a valid rule of inference from a truth about each member of a class of individuals to the truth about a particular individual of that class. It is generally given as a quantification rule for the universal quantifier but it can also be encoded in an axiom schema. It is one of the basic principles used in quantification theory.

Example: "All dogs are mammals. Fido is a dog. Therefore Fido is a mammal."

Formally, the rule as an axiom schema is given as
$$\forall x \, A \Rightarrow A\{x \mapsto t\},$$
for every formula A and every term t, where $A\{x \mapsto t\}$ is the result of substituting t for each free occurrence of x in A. $\, A\{x \mapsto t\}$ is an instance of $\forall x \, A.$

And as a rule of inference it is

from $\vdash \forall x A$ infer $\vdash A \{ x \mapsto t \} .$

Irving Copi noted that universal instantiation "...follows from variants of rules for 'natural deduction', which were devised independently by Gerhard Gentzen and Stanisław Jaśkowski in 1934."

== Quine ==
According to Willard Van Orman Quine, universal instantiation and existential generalization are two aspects of a single principle, for instead of saying that "∀x x = x" implies "Socrates = Socrates", we could as well say that the denial "Socrates ≠ Socrates" implies "∃x x ≠ x". The principle embodied in these two operations is the link between quantifications and the singular statements that are related to them as instances. Yet it is a principle only by courtesy. It holds only in the case where a term names and, furthermore, occurs referentially.

== See also ==
- Existential instantiation
- Existential quantification
