= Existential fallacy =

Type of formal fallacy

The existential fallacy, or existential instantiation, is a formal fallacy. In the existential fallacy, one presupposes that a class has members when one is not supposed to do so; i.e., when one should not assume existential import. Not to be confused with the 'Affirming the consequent', as in "If A, then B. B. Therefore A".

One example would be: "Every unicorn has a horn on its forehead". It does not imply that there are any unicorns at all in the world, and thus it cannot be assumed that, if the statement were true, somewhere there is a unicorn in the world (with a horn on its forehead). The statement, if assumed true, implies only that if there were any unicorns, each would definitely have a horn on its forehead.

== Overview ==
An existential fallacy is committed in a medieval categorical syllogism because it has two universal premises and a particular conclusion with no assumption that at least one member of the class exists, an assumption which is not established by the premises.

In modern logic, the presupposition that a class has members is seen as unacceptable. In 1905, Bertrand Russell wrote an essay entitled "The Existential Import of Proposition", in which he called this Boolean approach "Peano's interpretation".

The fallacy does not occur in enthymemes, where hidden premises required to make the syllogism valid assume the existence of at least one member of the class.

== Examples ==
1. All trespassers will be prosecuted.
2. Therefore, some of those prosecuted will have trespassed.

This is a fallacy because the first statement does not require the existence of any actual trespassers (stating only what would happen if some do exist), and therefore does not prove the existence of any. Note that this is a fallacy whether or not anyone has trespassed.

== See also ==
- Affirming the consequent
- Quantifier (logic)
- Vacuous truth
