= Inference =

Steps in reasoning

Inferences are steps in logical reasoning, moving from premises to logical consequences. Inference is traditionally divided into deduction and induction, a distinction that dates at least to Aristotle (300s BC). A third type of inference, abduction, has been proposed, notably by Charles Sanders Peirce. Deduction is inference deriving logical conclusions from premises known or assumed to be true, with the laws of valid inference being studied in logic. Induction is inference from particular evidence to a universal conclusion. Abduction seeks neither logical certainty nor a universal conclusion but a "best explanation" based on likelihood given the evidence.

Various fields study how inference is done in practice. Human inference (i.e. how humans draw conclusions) is traditionally studied within the fields of logic, argumentation studies, and cognitive psychology; artificial intelligence researchers develop automated inference systems to emulate human inference.

== Definition ==
The process by which a general conclusion is inferred from multiple observations is called inductive reasoning. The conclusion may be correct or incorrect, or correct to within a certain degree of accuracy, or correct in certain situations. Conclusions inferred from multiple observations may be tested by additional observations.

This definition is disputable (due to its lack of clarity. Ref: Oxford English dictionary: "induction ... 3. Logic the inference of a general law from particular instances.") The definition given thus applies only when the "conclusion" is general.

Two possible definitions of "inference" are:

1. A conclusion reached on the basis of evidence and reasoning.
2. The process of reaching such a conclusion.

== Examples ==
=== Example for definition #1 ===
Ancient Greek philosophers defined a number of syllogisms, correct three part inferences, that can be used as building blocks for more complex reasoning. We begin with a famous example:

1. All humans are mortal.
2. All Greeks are humans.
3. All Greeks are mortal.

The reader can check that the premises and conclusion are true, but logic is concerned with inference: does the truth of the conclusion follow from that of the premises?

The validity of an inference depends on the form of the inference. That is, the word "valid" does not refer to the truth of the premises or the conclusion, but rather to the form of the inference. An inference can be valid even if the parts are false, and can be invalid even if some parts are true. But a valid form with true premises will always have a true conclusion.

For example, consider the form of the following symbological track:

1. All meat comes from animals.
2. All beef is meat.
3. Therefore, all beef comes from animals.

If the premises are true, then the conclusion is necessarily true, too.

Now we turn to an invalid form.

1. All A are B.
2. All C are B.
3. Therefore, all C are A.

To show that this form is invalid, we demonstrate how it can lead from true premises to a false conclusion.

1. All apples are fruit. (True)
2. All bananas are fruit. (True)
3. Therefore, all bananas are apples. (False)

A valid argument with a false premise may lead to a false conclusion, (this and the following examples do not follow the Greek syllogism):

1. All tall people are French. (False)
2. John Lennon was tall. (True)
3. Therefore, John Lennon was French. (False)

When a valid argument is used to derive a false conclusion from a false premise, the inference is valid because it follows the form of a correct inference.

A valid argument can also be used to derive a true conclusion from a false premise:

1. All tall people are musicians. (Valid, False)
2. John Lennon was tall. (Valid, True)
3. Therefore, John Lennon was a musician. (Valid, True)

In this case we have one false premise and one true premise where a true conclusion has been inferred.

=== Example for definition #2 ===
Evidence: It is the early 1950s and you are an American stationed in the Soviet Union. You read in the Moscow newspaper that a soccer team from a small city in Siberia starts winning game after game. The team even defeats the Moscow team. Inference: The small city in Siberia is not a small city anymore. The Soviets are working on their own nuclear or high-value secret weapons program.

Knowns: The Soviet Union is a command economy: people and material are told where to go and what to do. The small city was remote and historically had never distinguished itself; its soccer season was typically short because of the weather.

Explanation: In a command economy, people and material are moved where they are needed. Large cities might field good teams due to the greater availability of high quality players; and teams that can practice longer (possibly due to sunnier weather and better facilities) can reasonably be expected to be better. In addition, you put your best and brightest in places where they can do the most good—such as on high-value weapons programs. It is an anomaly for a small city to field such a good team. The anomaly indirectly described a condition by which the observer inferred a new meaningful pattern—that the small city was no longer small. Why would you put a large city of your best and brightest in the middle of nowhere? To hide them, of course.

== Incorrect inference ==
An incorrect inference is known as a fallacy. Philosophers who study informal logic have compiled large lists of them. Cognitive psychologists have documented many biases in human reasoning that favor incorrect reasoning, and explain them with the use of heuristics in human reasoning.

One example of human reasoning bias is the confirmation bias, where people tend to seek information that confirms their beliefs rather than information that may contradict it, even though the latter (falsifications) is more informative for deductive reasoning. This is demonstrated by the Wason selection task. Another example, involving probabilistic reasoning, is the conjunction fallacy, where people judge a conjunction $A \wedge B$ to be more probable than a single conjunct $A$, because $B$ contains more "representative" content. This is demonstrated by the "Linda problem" and explained with the use of a representativeness heuristic.

== Applications ==
=== Inference engines ===
AI systems first provided automated logical inference. These were popular research topics, leading to industrial applications under the form of expert systems and later business rule engines. More recent work on automated theorem proving has had a stronger basis in formal logic.

An inference system's job is to extend a knowledge base automatically. The knowledge base (KB) is a set of propositions that represent what the system knows about the world. Several techniques can be used by that system to extend KB by means of valid inferences. An additional requirement is that the conclusions the system arrives at are relevant to its task.

Additionally, the term 'inference' has also been applied to the process of generating predictions from trained neural networks. In this context, an 'inference engine' refers to the system or hardware performing these operations. This type of inference is widely used in applications ranging from image recognition to natural language processing.

==== Prolog engine ====
Prolog (for "Programming in Logic") is a programming language based on a subset of predicate calculus. Its main job is to check whether a certain proposition can be inferred from a KB (knowledge base) using an algorithm called backward chaining.

Let us return to our Socrates syllogism. We enter into our Knowledge Base the following piece of code:

mortal(X) :- 	man(X).
man(socrates). 

( Here :- can be read as "if". Generally, if P $\to$ Q (if P then Q) then in Prolog we would code Q:-P (Q if P).)
This states that all men are mortal and that Socrates is a man. Now we can ask the Prolog system about Socrates:

?- mortal(socrates).

(where ?- signifies a query: Can mortal(socrates). be deduced from the KB using the rules) gives the answer "Yes".

On the other hand, asking the Prolog system the following:

?- mortal(plato).

gives the answer "No".

This is because Prolog does not know anything about Plato, and hence defaults to any property about Plato being false (the so-called closed world assumption). Finally ?- mortal(X) (Is anything mortal) would result in "Yes" (and in some implementations: "Yes": X=socrates)
Prolog can be used for vastly more complicated inference tasks. See the corresponding article for further examples.

=== Semantic web ===
Recently automatic reasoners found in semantic web a new field of application. Being based upon description logic, knowledge expressed using one variant of OWL can be logically processed, i.e., inferences can be made upon it.

=== Bayesian statistics and probability logic ===
Philosophers and scientists who follow the Bayesian framework for inference use the mathematical rules of probability to find this best explanation. The Bayesian view has a number of desirable features—one of them is that it embeds deductive (certain) logic as a subset (this prompts some writers to call Bayesian probability "probability logic", following E. T. Jaynes).

Bayesians identify probabilities with degrees of beliefs, with certainly true propositions having probability 1, and certainly false propositions having probability 0. To say that "it's going to rain tomorrow" has a 0.9 probability is to say that you consider the possibility of rain tomorrow as extremely likely.

Through the rules of probability, the probability of a conclusion and of alternatives can be calculated. The best explanation is most often identified with the most probable (see Bayesian decision theory). A central rule of Bayesian inference is Bayes' theorem.

=== Non-monotonic logic ===
For example, logicians have worked to develop a formal logic of reasons, using variants of non-monotonic logic.

== See also ==
- A priori and a posteriori – Two types of knowledge, justification, or argument
- Abductive reasoning – Inference seeking the simplest and most likely explanation
- Deductive reasoning – Form of reasoning
- Inductive reasoning – Method of logical reasoning
- Entailment – Relationship in which one statement follows from another
- Epilogism
- Analogy – Form of figurative language
- Axiom system – Mathematical term; concerning axioms used to derive theorems
  - Axiom – Statement that is taken to be true
- Immediate inference – Logical inference from a single statement
- Inquiry – Type of investigation
- Logic – Study of correct reasoning
- Logic of information
- Logical assertion – Statement in a metalanguage
- Logical graph – Type of diagrammatic notation for propositional logic
- Rule of inference – Method of deriving conclusions
- List of rules of inference
- Theorem – In mathematics, a statement that has been proven
- Transduction (machine learning) – Type of statistical inference
