= Logical conjunction =

Logical connective AND

AND
- Definition: $xy$
- Truth table: $(1000)$
- Logic gate

Normal forms
- Disjunctive: $xy$
- Conjunctive: $xy$
- Zhegalkin polynomial: $xy$

Post's lattices
- 0-preserving: yes
- 1-preserving: yes
- Monotone: yes
- Affine: no
- Self-dual: no

Venn diagram of $A \wedge B \land C$

In logic, mathematics and linguistics, and ($\wedge$) is the truth-functional operator of conjunction or logical conjunction. The logical connective of this operator is typically represented as $\wedge$ or $\&$ or $K$ (prefix) or $\times$ or $\cdot$ in which $\wedge$ is the most modern and widely used.

The and of a set of operands is true if and only if all of its operands are true, i.e., $A \land B$ is true if and only if $A$ is true and $B$ is true.

An operand of a conjunction is a conjunct.

Beyond logic, the term "conjunction" also refers to similar concepts in other fields:

- In natural language, the denotation of expressions such as English "and";
- In programming languages, the short-circuit and control structure;
- In set theory, intersection.
- In lattice theory, logical conjunction (greatest lower bound).

== Notation ==
And is usually denoted by an infix operator: in mathematics and logic, it is denoted by a "wedge" $\wedge$ (Unicode U+2227 ∧ LOGICAL AND), $\&$ or $\times$; in electronics, $\cdot$; and in programming languages &, &&, or and. In Jan Łukasiewicz's prefix notation for logic, the operator is $K$, for Polish koniunkcja.

In mathematics, the conjunction of an arbitrary number of elements $a_1, \ldots, a_n$ can be denoted as an iterated binary operation using a "big wedge" ⋀ (Unicode U+22C0 ⋀ N-ARY LOGICAL AND):

$\bigwedge_{i=1}^{n} a_i = a_1 \wedge a_2 \wedge \ldots a_{n-1} \wedge a_{n}$

== Definition ==
In classical logic, logical conjunction is an operation on two logical values, typically the values of two propositions, that produces a value of true if and only if (also known as iff) both of its operands are true.

The conjunctive identity is true, which is to say that AND-ing an expression with true will never change the value of the expression. In keeping with the concept of vacuous truth, when conjunction is defined as an operator or function of arbitrary arity, the empty conjunction (AND-ing over an empty set of operands) is often defined as having the result true.

=== Truth table ===
Conjunctions of the arguments on the left — The true bits form a Sierpinski triangle.

The truth table of $A \land B$:

$A$	$B$	$A \land B$
F	F	F
F	T	F
T	F	F
T	T	T

=== Defined by other operators ===
In systems where logical conjunction is not a primitive, it may be defined as

$$A \land B = \neg(A \to \neg B)$$

It can be checked by the following truth table (compare the last two columns):

$A$	$B$	$\neg B$	$A \rightarrow \neg B$	$\neg(A \rightarrow \neg B)$	$A \land B$
F	F	T	T	F	F
F	T	F	T	F	F
T	F	T	T	F	F
T	T	F	F	T	T

or

$$A \land B = \neg(\neg A \lor \neg B).$$

It can be checked by the following truth table (compare the last two columns):

$A$	$B$	$\neg A$	$\neg B$	$\neg A \or \neg B$	$\neg(\neg A \or \neg B)$	$A \land B$
F	F	T	T	T	F	F
F	T	T	F	T	F	F
T	F	F	T	T	F	F
T	T	F	F	F	T	T

== Introduction and elimination rules ==
As a rule of inference, conjunction introduction is a classically valid, simple argument form. The argument form has two premises, $A$ and $B$. Intuitively, it permits the inference of their conjunction.

$$A$$,
$$B$$.
Therefore, A and B.

or in logical operator notation, where $\vdash$ expresses provability:

$$\vdash A,$$
$$\vdash B$$
$$\vdash A \land B$$

Here is an example of an argument that fits the form conjunction introduction:

Bob likes apples.
Bob likes oranges.
Therefore, Bob likes apples and Bob likes oranges.

Conjunction elimination is another classically valid, simple argument form. Intuitively, it permits the inference from any conjunction of either element of that conjunction.

$A$ and $B$.
Therefore, $A$.

...or alternatively,

$A$ and $B$.
Therefore, $B$.

In logical operator notation:

$$\vdash A \land B$$
$$\vdash A$$

...or alternatively,

$$\vdash A \land B$$
$$\vdash B$$

== Negation ==
=== Definition ===
A conjunction $A\land B$ is proven false by establishing either $\neg A$ or $\neg B$. In terms of the object language, this reads

$$\neg A\to\neg(A\land B)$$

This formula can be seen as a special case of

$$(A\to C) \to ( (A\land B)\to C )$$

when $C$ is a false proposition.

=== Other proof strategies ===
If $A$ implies $\neg B$, then both $\neg A$ as well as $A$ prove the conjunction false:

$$(A\to\neg{}B)\to\neg(A\land B)$$

In other words, a conjunction can actually be proven false just by knowing about the relation of its conjuncts, and not necessary about their truth values.

This formula can be seen as a special case of

$$(A\to(B\to C))\to ( (A\land B)\to C )$$

when $C$ is a false proposition.

Either of the above are constructively valid proofs by contradiction.

== Properties ==
commutativity: yes

$A \land B$	$\Leftrightarrow$	$B \land A$
	$\Leftrightarrow$

associativity: yes

$~A$	$~~~\land~~~$	$(B \land C)$	$\Leftrightarrow$		$(A \land B)$	$~~~\land~~~$	$~C$
	$~~~\land~~~$		$\Leftrightarrow$	$\Leftrightarrow$		$~~~\land~~~$

distributivity: with various operations, especially with or

$~A$	$\land$	$(B \lor C)$	$\Leftrightarrow$		$(A \land B)$	$\lor$	$(A \land C)$
	$\land$		$\Leftrightarrow$	$\Leftrightarrow$		$\lor$

others

with exclusive or:

$~A$	$\land$	$(B \oplus C)$	$\Leftrightarrow$		$(A \land B)$	$\oplus$	$(A \land C)$
	$\land$		$\Leftrightarrow$	$\Leftrightarrow$		$\oplus$

with material nonimplication:

$~A$	$\land$	$(B \nrightarrow C)$	$\Leftrightarrow$		$(A \land B)$	$\nrightarrow$	$(A \land C)$
	$\land$		$\Leftrightarrow$	$\Leftrightarrow$		$\nrightarrow$

with itself:

$~A$	$\land$	$(B \land C)$	$\Leftrightarrow$		$(A \land B)$	$\land$	$(A \land C)$
	$\land$		$\Leftrightarrow$	$\Leftrightarrow$		$\land$

idempotency: yes

$~A~$	$~\land~$	$~A~$	$\Leftrightarrow$	$A~$
	$~\land~$		$\Leftrightarrow$

monotonicity: yes

$A \rightarrow B$	$\Rightarrow$		$(A \land C)$	$\rightarrow$	$(B \land C)$
	$\Rightarrow$	$\Leftrightarrow$		$\rightarrow$

truth-preserving: yes
When all inputs are true, the output is true.

$A \land B$	$\Rightarrow$	$A \land B$
	$\Rightarrow$
		(to be tested)

falsehood-preserving: yes
When all inputs are false, the output is false.

$A \land B$	$\Rightarrow$	$A \lor B$
	$\Rightarrow$
(to be tested)

Walsh spectrum: (1,-1,-1,1)

Nonlinearity: 1 (the function is bent)

If using binary values for true (1) and false (0), then logical conjunction works exactly like normal arithmetic multiplication.

== Applications in computer engineering ==
AND logic gate

In high-level computer programming and digital electronics, logical conjunction is commonly represented by an infix operator, usually as a keyword such as "AND", an algebraic multiplication, or the ampersand symbol & (sometimes doubled as in &&). Many languages also provide short-circuit control structures corresponding to logical conjunction.

Logical conjunction is often used for bitwise operations, where 0 corresponds to false and 1 to true:

- 0 AND 0 = 0,
- 0 AND 1 = 0,
- 1 AND 0 = 0,
- 1 AND 1 = 1.

The operation can also be applied to two binary words viewed as bitstrings of equal length, by taking the bitwise AND of each pair of bits at corresponding positions. For example:

- 11000110 AND 10100011 = 10000010.

This can be used to select part of a bitstring using a bit mask. For example, 10011101 AND 00001000 = 00001000 extracts the fourth bit of an 8-bit bitstring.

In computer networking, bit masks are used to derive the network address of a subnet within an existing network from a given IP address, by ANDing the IP address and the subnet mask.

Logical conjunction "AND" is also used in SQL operations to form database queries.

The Curry–Howard correspondence relates logical conjunction to product types.

== Set-theoretic correspondence ==
The membership of an element of an intersection set in set theory is defined in terms of a logical conjunction: $x\in A\cap B$ if and only if $(x\in A)\wedge (x\in B)$. Through this correspondence, set-theoretic intersection shares several properties with logical conjunction, such as associativity, commutativity and idempotence.

== Natural language ==
As with other notions formalized in mathematical logic, the logical conjunction and is related to, but not the same as, the grammatical conjunction and in natural languages.

English "and" has properties not captured by logical conjunction. For example, "and" sometimes implies order having the sense of "then". For example, "They got married and had a child" in common discourse means that the marriage came before the child.

The word "and" can also imply a partition of a thing into parts, as "The American flag is red, white, and blue." Here, it is not meant that the flag is at once red, white, and blue, but rather that each color is a part of the flag.

== See also ==
- AND gate – Digital logic gate type
- And-inverter graph – Graph representing an implementation of the logical functionality of a network
- Bitwise AND – Bit-by-bit binary operation
- Boolean algebra – Algebraic manipulation of "true" and "false"
- Boolean conjunctive query – Query returning true/false based on whether a conjunction of conditions holds
- Boolean domain – Concept in mathematical logic
- Boolean function – Function returning one of only two values
- Boolean-valued function – Function that outputs either true or false
- Conjunction (grammar) – Part of speech that connects two words, sentences, phrases, or clauses
- Conjunction elimination – Inference rule in logic
- Conjunction/disjunction duality – Properties linking logical conjunction and disjunction
- De Morgan's laws – Pair of logical equivalences
- First-order logic – Type of logical system
- Fréchet inequalities – Rules in probabilistic logic
- Homogeneity (linguistics) – Semantic property of plurals
- List of Boolean algebra topics
- Logical disjunction – Logical connective OR
- Logical graph – Type of diagrammatic notation for propositional logic
- Negation – Logical operation
- Operation – Addition, multiplication, division, ...
- Peano–Russell notation – Notation used in mathematical logic
- Propositional calculus – Branch of logic
