= The Bed of Nails (Yes Minister) =

- Yes Minister episode
- Episode no.: Series 3 Episode 5
- Written by: Antony Jay; Jonathan Lynn
- Original air date: 9 December 1982

Guest appearances
- John Nettleton; Nigel Stock; David Rose; Robert East; Peter Dennis; David Firth

Episode chronology
← Previous "The Moral Dimension"	Next → "The Whisky Priest"

"The Bed of Nails" is the nineteenth episode of the BBC comedy series Yes Minister, first broadcast 9 December 1982, in which Jim Hacker unwisely accepts the role of 'Transport Supremo' with a view to developing a 'National Integrated Transport Policy' for the UK. It soon becomes apparent that opposition from various transport interests, the unions, and elements within the Department of Transport itself will make implementation impossible, and the policy is promptly ditched following a number of carefully calculated 'leaks'.

The episode has been credited with introducing the phrase 'Integrated Transport', which is now widely used within UK transport policy circles, and also for describing with some accuracy the dynamics operating within the Department of Transport.

== Plot ==
The Prime Minister's special advisor, Sir Mark Spencer, meets with the Cabinet Secretary, Sir Arnold Robinson, in 10 Downing Street. The Prime Minister wants an Integrated Transport Policy, the implementation of which would be a political minefield—it would be popular with the public, but an overall vote loser for whoever attempted to implement it. The role had already been declined by the Secretary of State for Transport, and the civil service simply wish to make it appear that something will be done. Sir Arnold therefore proposes to appoint someone who can create "lots of activity, but no actual achievement", and concludes that Jim Hacker is the ideal candidate.

Recognising that Hacker's Permanent Secretary, Sir Humphrey Appleby would advise against him accepting the role, they brief Hacker alone and flatter him with a new title 'Transport Supremo', describing the post as "an honour" and highlighting all the positive aspects of the position. They further outline the current system's deficiencies which the policy should address: rationalisation of the road (specifically the motorways) and railway networks to avoid duplication, the absence of links between Heathrow Airport and a nearby rail mainline (which is the Great Western Main Line in real life), lack of coordination between the railways and bus services, lack of single tickets that can be used on both British Rail services and the London Underground, and lack of combined bus and railway timetables (including bus timetables in railway stations). They decline to mention any of the problems in achieving these, and pressure him to agree immediately without consulting with Sir Humphrey, which he does.

Hacker goes back to his office to tell Sir Humphrey and Bernard the good news. Sir Humphrey immediately baulks at the idea, then outlines the many disadvantages of this new role, which, it turns out, has been circulating around Whitehall for weeks. He explains that if a policy favours one sector, it will infuriate those that it sidelines: a ruling that favours the road services will upset the railways; if it supports the railways then the road lobby will "massacre [him]", and if it upsets British Airways' investment plans, "they will call a devastating press conference that same afternoon". He further points out that the seemingly flattering title 'Transport Supremo' is rendered within the service as "Transport Muggins".

Sir Humphrey proposes to illustrate this by arranging a meeting for the Minister with three under-secretaries, from the Roads, Rail, and Air Transport divisions. At the meeting, it becomes clear that there is little scope for agreement, as each wants to expand their own branch's contract at the expense of the others. Hacker then tells them that he wants to reduce the overall transport budget, at which point there is an implied agreement by the three under-secretaries that this would be met by devastating strike action across all three transport sectors.

Hacker subsequently asks Bernard why these three civil servants appeared to be fighting their own corners instead of supporting the government. The Principal Private Secretary explains that this is how the civil service works: each department is controlled by those that it is supposed to be controlling. By way of example, he explains that comprehensive education was adopted in the United Kingdom as a result of lobbying by the National Union of Teachers who were the most powerful sectional interest and had a long term close relation with the Department of Education and Skills (DES). He then explains that this arrangement worked across all government departments.

Hacker now concludes that the task is impossible, and asks Sir Humphrey for advice on how to get out of the commitment. Together, they decide that a few "local repercussions" of the policy, specifically impacting the Prime Minister's own constituency with job losses and unwanted development, would do the job nicely. Humphrey then suggests that if a journalist—such as the one he's about to have lunch with—got hold of the document, there would be a national outcry, and, as they have to circulate copies to every department, it would be difficult to track down the source of any leak that might occur. Sir Humphrey has lunch with Peter Maxwell, a journalist from The Times over which he outlines the negative implications of the policy on the constituency and then he 'accidentally' leaves a copy of Hacker's memo for the journalist to retrieve.

A few days later, Hacker is called back to Number 10, where Sir Mark Spencer informs him of the PM's displeasure after their confidential report had appeared in The Times. Furthermore, another report has appeared in the PM's local paper, scotching rumours of any unfortunate side-effects to the policy, and forcing Hacker to rethink his proposals. Hacker is suspicious about where this second leak came from, but Sir Mark is adamant that "the PM's office does not leak".

Meanwhile, Sir Humphrey has already prepared a Plan B, a new non-proposal with high staff and high cost, which will let HM Treasury "have a fit". The plan proposes a new 'National Transport Authority', with a staff of 80,000 and a budget of £1,000,000,000 per year. They consider leaking this as well, knowing that it will most likely lead to a leak inquiry. Bernard is worried about that prospect, but the others assure him that such inquiries are only ever for 'setting up', and never actually report. This is due to both the difficulties in blaming either civil servants or politicians, and the fact that, that in most cases, most leaks do in fact come from 10 Downing Street. As Sir Humphrey remarks, "the ship of state...is the only ship that leaks from the top".

Later, both Hacker and Sir Humphrey are brought in to discuss the latest leak with Sir Mark and Sir Arnold. Sir Mark tries to intimidate Hacker and Sir Humphrey by suggesting he could track down where the first leak came from (and thereby implicate them). However, Hacker replies that he could likewise find out where the leak for the PM's opposition to their plan originated, pointing out that a leak from the PM's office would, in terms of security, be more serious than one from a Cabinet Minister's private office. Hacker further points out that the inevitable public outcry over the leaks would make his job impossible, especially as all his proposals have been effectively denied. Beaten into a stalemate, Sir Mark and Sir Arnold agree to send the policy back to the Ministry of Transport, and to set up an immediate leak inquiry.

== Episode cast ==
Actor	Role
Paul Eddington	Jim Hacker
Nigel Hawthorne	Sir Humphrey Appleby
Derek Fowlds	Bernard Woolley
John Nettleton	Sir Arnold Robinson
Nigel Stock	Sir Mark Spencer
David Firth	Peter Maxwell
Peter Dennis	Under-Secretary, Air Division
Robert East	Under-Secretary, Rail Division
David Rose	Under-Secretary, Roads Division

=== Casting Notes ===
- Robert East, who portrayed the Under-Secretary for the Rail Division, also played Peter Gascoigne (Hacker's Foreign Affairs Private Secretary) in the Yes, Prime Minister episode "A Diplomatic Incident". It is assumed that they are the same person.
- David Rose, who portrayed the Under-Secretary for the Roads Division, also played a Party Guest in the Yes, Prime Minister episode "The Patron of the Arts". They may also be the same person.

== Reality ==
The episode is considered to be a good representation of some of the dynamics operating within the Department of Transport. A research paper published by Parliament in 2010 reflected on the question of how much policy is made by the minister and how much of it is influenced by the civil service, quoting from "A Bed of Nails".

The episode is often credited in the UK professional community as being the source of the term 'integrated transport'. A 'Commission for Integrated Transport' was established in 1998 "to provide independent advice to Government on the implementation of integrated transport policy, to monitor developments across transport, environment, health and other sectors and to review progress towards meeting our objectives" (this was abolished in the 2010 spending review). In 2008 the passenger transport authorities in a number of major UK conurbations were renamed integrated transport authorities. By 2010 the Department for Transport had an 'Integrated Transport Economics and Appraisal' unit which included in its remit to "develop a strategic National Transport Model for use by the Department in the assessment of a range of transport policy options. The Model uses data on how people travel according to their circumstances and where they live. It takes into account the choices available and the use people make of the different modes of transport—car, rail, bus, walk and cycle."

New Labour's first transport white paper A New Deal for Transport: Better for everyone in 1997 led to the formation of Transport Direct which established an information system to "deliver an integrated and comprehensive information service for all travel modes and mode combinations" and also to "develop integrated information and ticket sales for journeys involving more than one mode of transport". The first aim was achieved in 2004, but a comprehensive national ticketing system was not. The Integrated Transport Smartcard Organisation was established in 2001 to develop and maintain the relevant data standards for electronic ticketing. Some regional systems are in use and the Oyster card does allow travel on mainline rail and the London Underground in the London area. In 2010 the new government announced that it would introduce a national smart card ticketing system to make multi-modal journeys easy and seamless by 2014.
