= Tea lady =

Person who serves hot beverages in workplace

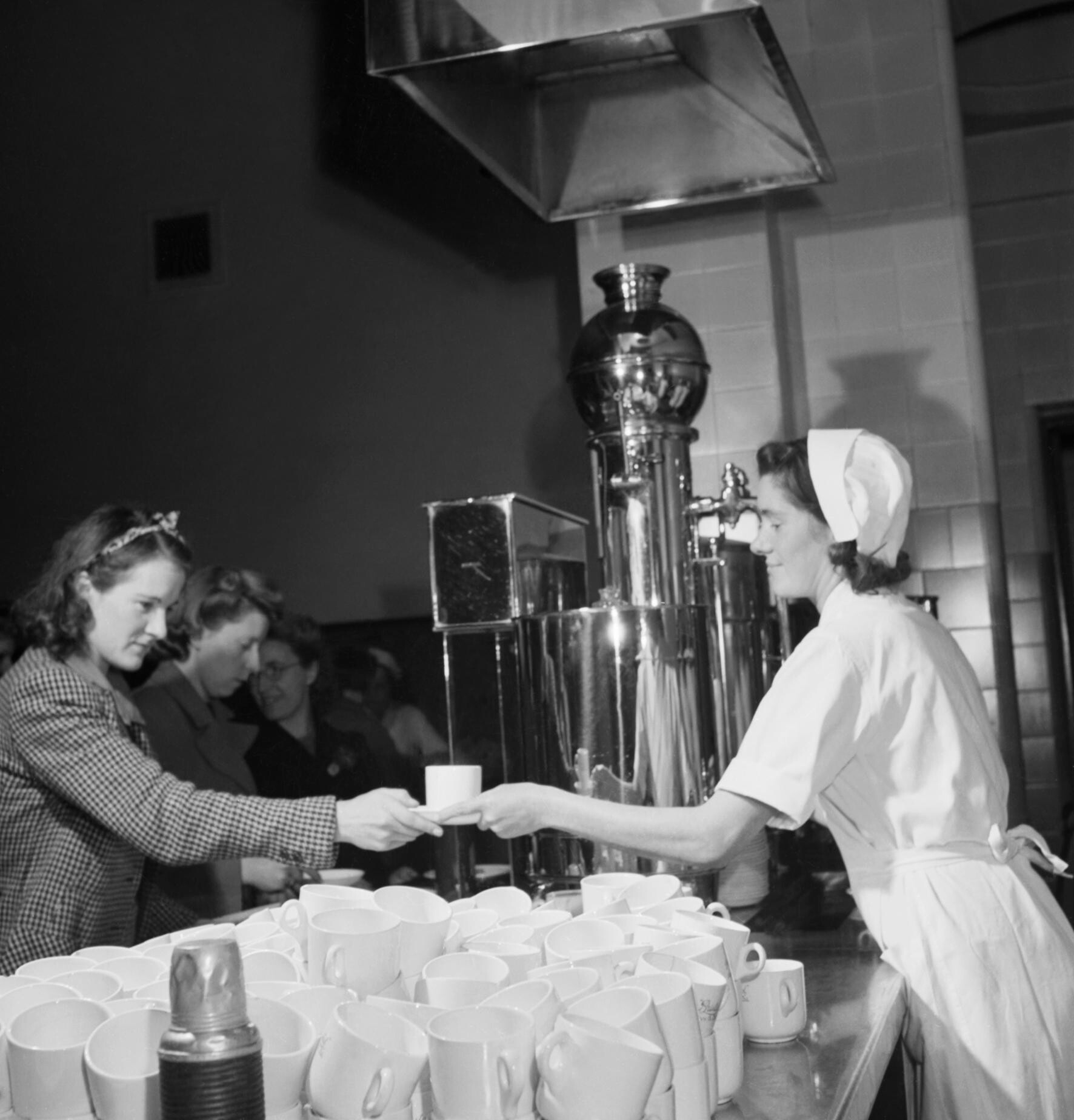
A British woman, working as a part-time tea lady, serves tea to a female worker at an aircraft factory in Bristol, 1942

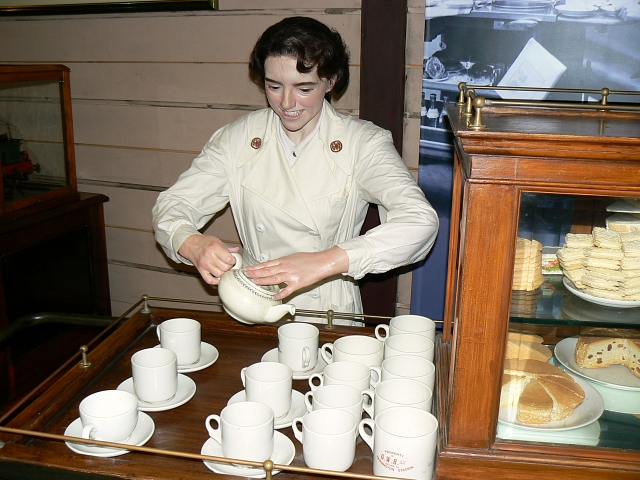
A tea lady in the Museum of the Great Western Railway, Swindon

A tea lady provides drinks in an office, factory, hospital, or other place of work. The role under this name began in Britain during World War II, and continues in the National Health Service today. It used to be a wide-spread occupation for women, and as such was well represented in popular culture.

== History ==
Tea ladies entered the mainstream in the UK during the Second World War, when they were used in an experiment to boost efficiency in workplaces for the war effort (see Women in World War II#Workplace). They had such a hugely positive effect on morale they became commonplace in all areas of work, mobile canteens even serving military units on exercises. They could be found in the workplace canteen or might have come around with a trolley, which typically carried a tea urn filled with hot tea or water, along with a variety of cakes and buns.

== Decline ==
This occupation began to die out in the late 1970s to early 1980s when tea ladies began to be replaced by private catering firms and vending machines, as businesses expanded and women moved into different jobs. The tradition of the tea break, from which the role of tea lady rose, has itself declined, also offering a possible explanation why tea ladies are not commonly found today.

In Britain, market research in 2005 showed that of those workers who drank more than four cups of tea a day, only 2% of them received it from a tea lady, whereas 66% received it from a tea urn, and 15% from a vending machine.

In Australia, Jenny Stewart, Professor of Public Policy in the University of New South Wales, uses the decline of the tea lady within the civil service as an example of "managerial solipsism": they provided civil servants with dependable "patterns of civilised sociability" at "significant economies of scale", but "they just faded away, as departments searched for easy ways of making savings".

== Current role ==
Tea ladies still exist in the National Health Service (NHS) though the job of tea attendant is no longer restricted to women workers. Some hospital tea trolleys are operated by the Royal Voluntary Service. Patients often comment on the tea ladies, and how their care made a hospital stay more bearable.

== Media ==
In the past Tea Ladies were often upheld as virtues of womanhood, in British comedy, with a tea lady usually portrayed as a jocular, humorous, well rounded, middle aged woman in a uniform and cap, or as a very pretty young women gaining appreciative comments from her co-workers, as in the film Carry On at Your Convenience (1971).

In Australia, a sitcom called The Tea Ladies aired on Melbourne's ATV-0 in 1978. Starring Pat McDonald and Sue Jones, it was set in the staff canteen at Canberra's Parliament House and featured topical humour referencing real-life politicians.

Tea ladies in general were a frequent target of illusory "cuts" and "economies" in Yes Minister, frequently conjured up by Nigel Hawthorne's character Sir Humphrey Appleby, but a tea lady was only once seen onscreen during the whole five-series run of the show, sharing a lift with Jim Hacker and Sir Humphrey Appleby in the episode "The Skeleton in the Cupboard" (1982).

The 2003 film Love Actually featured Martine McCutcheon as tea lady at 10 Downing Street.

== See also ==
- Nippy – Waitress at J. Lyons tea shops
- Break (work)
- Chaiwala, a similar occupation in India
- Dinner lady, a school lunch worker
