= Prime Minister (disambiguation) =

The prime minister is the most senior member of the cabinet in a parliamentary system of government.

It may also refer to:

- The Prime Minister (novel), a novel by Anthony Trollope
- The Prime Minister (film), a biography of former British Prime Minister Benjamin Disraeli
- The Prime Minister (2016 film), original title De Premier, British title President Under Siege a thriller by Erik Van Looy
- Prime Minister (2025 film), a documentary film about Jacinda Ardern, the prime minister of New Zealand from 2017 to 2023
- Prime Minister (TV series) (also known as Ekipa), a 2007 Polish political drama
- Prime Minister (band), a Russian band
- Yes, Prime Minister, 1986-1988 British sequel to the BBC’s Yes Minister comedy
- Yes, Prime Minister (2013 TV series), revival of the 1988 British sitcom

== See also ==
- Prime Minista (rapper), an alternate nickname for Anthony L. Ray (born 1963), Sir Mix-a-Lot
