= Politician's syllogism =

Type of logical fallacy

The politician's syllogism, also known as the politician's logic or the politician's fallacy, is a logical fallacy of the form:

1. We must do something.
2. This is something.
3. Therefore, we must do this.

The politician's fallacy was identified in a 1988 episode of the BBC television political sitcom Yes, Prime Minister titled "Power to the People", and has taken added life on the Internet. The syllogism, invented by fictional British civil servants, has been quoted in the real British Parliament. The syllogism has also been quoted in American political discussion.

As a meme, the quasi-formal name "politician's syllogism" is clunky and not widely known; the notion is often conveyed by invoking the central phrase this is something with ironic import, such as when a major league sports team whose season is in dire straits exchanges an aging athlete with a bad leg for an aging athlete with a bad arm.

== Overview ==
In Yes, Prime Minister, the term is discussed between the Cabinet Secretary Sir Humphrey Appleby and his predecessor Sir Arnold Robinson, who are concerned about the prime minister's plans to reform local government due to political opposition from one local council, believing that it would result in regional government and, as they would argue, a series of ill-considered policy decisions. On this issue, as with many other issues humorously explored by the show, the civil servants believe that doing anything is worse than doing nothing because actions tend to undermine the dominance of the civil service. They identify the politician's logic as a fallacious categorical syllogism:

1. All cats have four legs.
2. My dog has four legs.
3. Therefore, my dog is a cat.

This invalid form of argument, labeled AAA-2 among syllogisms, commits the fallacy of the undistributed middle: it says nothing about all things having four legs (the middle term) and thus the conclusion does not logically follow from the premises, even if the premises are true. The politician's syllogism similarly says nothing about all known "somethings" that could be done. As is common with fallacious undistributed middle arguments, it can also be seen as the fallacy of affirming the consequent when restated as an equivalent hypothetical syllogism:

1. To improve things, things must change.
2. We are changing things.
3. Therefore, we are improving things.

== See also ==
- List of fallacies
