= Yes, Prime Minister (2013 TV series) =

British political satire sitcom revival

- Series title card
- Genre: Political satire; Sitcom
- Written by: Antony Jay; Jonathan Lynn
- Directed by: Jonathan Lynn; Gareth Gwenlan
- Starring: David Haig; Henry Goodman; Chris Larkin; Zoe Telford
- Theme music composer: Ronnie Hazlehurst; Graham Jarvis
- Country of origin: United Kingdom
- Original language: English
- No. of seasons: 1
- No. of episodes: 6

Production
- Executive producers: Antony Jay; Anne Gilchrist
- Producers: Jonathan Lynn; Gareth Gwenlan
- Production location: BBC Television Centre
- Cinematography: John Record
- Editor: Chris Wadsworth
- Camera setup: Multi-camera
- Running time: 30 minutes
- Production company: BBC

Original release
- Network: Gold
- Release: 15 January – 19 February 2013

Related
- Yes Minister

Yes, Prime Minister is a British political satire sitcom from 2013, written by Antony Jay and Jonathan Lynn. The series is a revival of the sitcom Yes Minister, and Yes, Prime Minister, which ran from 1986 to 1988. It stars David Haig as Prime Minister Jim Hacker, Henry Goodman as Sir Humphrey, Chris Larkin as Bernard Woolley, and Zoe Telford as Claire Sutton. The revived series was based on a 2010 stage production, which was also written by Jay and Lynn.

== Plot ==
Set in Chequers in 2013, the revived series sees Prime Minister Jim Hacker now leading a coalition government. Hacker must use all his wits to deal with economic downturn, his coalition partners having a leadership crisis, and the growing tensions involving Scottish independence.

== Characters ==
=== Jim Hacker ===
Jim Hacker (David Haig), formerly the Minister for the fictional Department of Administrative Affairs, became the Prime Minister of the United Kingdom in the special Yes Minister episode "Party Games". Hacker is prone to potentially embarrassing blunders, and is a frequent target of criticism from the press. However, he is also shown to be relatively politically savvy, and he slowly becomes more aware of his conniving Cabinet Secretary Sir Humphrey's real agenda. Haig's portrayal was more manic than Paul Eddington's had been.

=== Sir Humphrey Appleby ===
Sir Humphrey Appleby (Henry Goodman) had been appointed Cabinet Secretary just as Hacker's party entered a leadership crisis, and was instrumental in Hacker's elevation to Prime Minister. Sir Humphrey is a master of obfuscation and manipulation, baffling his opponents with long-winded technical jargon and circumlocutions, strategically appointing allies to supposedly impartial boards, and setting up interdepartmental committees to smother his minister's proposals in red tape. Goodman's Sir Humphrey was more aloof and supercilious than Hawthorne's had been.

=== Bernard Woolley ===
Bernard Woolley (Chris Larkin) is Jim Hacker's Principal Private Secretary. His loyalties are often split between his Minister and his Civil Service boss, Sir Humphrey. He can occasionally appear rather childlike, making animal noises and gestures or by acting out how such an analogy cannot work, which sometimes annoys his Minister. Woolley tends to side with Hacker when new policies are announced, because they seem radical or democratic, only for Sir Humphrey to point out the disadvantages to the status quo and the civil service in particular. He confides in Claire Sutton, Hacker's policy advisor, that he does not mind if Hacker and Humphrey want different things, but finds his job impossible if they want "opposite things".

=== Claire Sutton ===
Hacker's young advisor, Claire Sutton (Zoe Telford), was originally introduced in the stage play (then played by Emily Joyce) and was retained for the 2013 television revival. She had a larger role than any of Hacker's other political advisors. Sutton is introduced by the Prime Minister as head of the policy unit at Number 10. She is a twenty-first century successor to Dorothy Wainwright, but less haughty and seemingly more willing to get her hands dirty. She is described by Jay and Lynn as in her late thirties, attractive and intelligent. She calls Hacker by his first name ("Fiscal mechanics, Jim"), whereas Dorothy addressed him as "Prime Minister". In response to a sarcastic interjection about "starving permanent secretaries", Sir Humphrey patronises her as "dear lady" (as he did "that Wainwright female" in the TV series). She acts as Hacker's political ally, and Hacker can rely on her when he needs to make a difficult decision.

Additionally, in keeping with the original series hosting appearances of real broadcasters and newscasters, Sophie Raworth can be seen on a television in the first episode of the series.

== Background ==
Jay and Lynn collaborated again to produce a stage play which ran from 13 May to 5 June 2010, at Chichester Festival Theatre. This production revived at the Gielgud Theatre, in London's West End from 17 September 2010 until 15 January 2011. The principal cast was David Haig as Jim Hacker, Henry Goodman as Sir Humphrey, Jonathan Slinger as Bernard Woolley and Emily Joyce as Claire Sutton, Hacker's special policy adviser. This production, while following the spirit and tone of the original series in many respects, was set contemporaneously at Chequers, the Prime Minister's country residence, with BlackBerrys frequently in evidence, and even included a topical reference to a coalition agreement which Sir Humphrey had drafted (the Conservatives and Liberal Democrats having formed a coalition government in Britain in May 2010). The plot was a little more provocative and risqué than most of those seen previously (including a debate about the ethics of procuring a twelve-year-old as a sexual partner for a visiting dignitary, a proposition which it is suggested might be spun in the national interest as a "euro-job") and included some stronger expletives (reflecting perhaps their widely reported use among New Labour's hierarchy between 1997 and 2010). There was also a higher element of traditional farce.

The play began a tour of the United Kingdom in February 2011, with Simon Williams as Sir Humphrey, Richard McCabe as Jim Hacker, Chris Larkin as Bernard and Charlotte Lucas as Claire Sutton. It returned to the West End in July 2011 for a ten-week run at the Apollo Theatre in Shaftesbury Avenue, with Williams and McCabe reprising their roles. The play then went back on a tour of the United Kingdom before returning to the West End with a revised script. Further rewrites took place before the 2012 UK tour and subsequent Trafalgar Studios run, the crucial change having replaced references from underage to multiple partner sex.

Reflecting in 2011 on the sustained topicality of Yes, Minister and Yes, Prime Minister, Jonathan Lynn noted that, since the opening of the stage show in Chichester, "all we've added is a couple of jokes about [telephone] hacking and an extra joke about the Greeks [subject at the time to a debt crisis]." He added that the original episodes were written about a year before transmission – "satirical comedy doesn't change" – and that "writing in 1986, we found the same headlines in 1956".

The stage play has been also produced internationally in Singapore and Kuala Lumpur in May 2014 by the British Theatre Playhouse. Additionally, the script of the play, Yes, Prime Minister, was published in paperback by Faber & Faber in 2010 (ISBN 978-0-571-26070-6).

== Episodes ==
The series screened on Gold from 9:00 pm. Each episode ran for a duration of 40 minutes. The premiere episode achieved overnight viewing figures of 283,000.

No. overall	No. in series	Title	Original release date
1	1	"Crisis at the Summit"	15 January 2013
Jim Hacker's premiership is falling apart when a saviour appears—Kumranistan!
2	2	"The Poisoned Chalice"	22 January 2013
Jim holds a dinner to welcome the Kumranistan Foreign Secretary.
3	3	"Gentlemen's Agreement"	29 January 2013
Humphrey's pro-Euro scheme has been stymied. But then some expenses claims are revealed.
4	4	"A Diplomatic Dilemma"	5 February 2013
Desperate to secure the Kumranistan loan agreement, Jim must provide some unusual sexual arrangements.
5	5	"Scot Free"	12 February 2013
Another crisis looms for Jim Hacker when a coalition partner threatens to jump ship.
6	6	"A Tsar is Born"	19 February 2013
Jim's efforts to appease the Kumranistan Foreign Secretary have failed. But then, Sir Humphrey has a plan.

== Reception ==
Critical reaction for the series was largely negative. Jay and Lynn revealed that they had offered the show first to the BBC, but that the corporation had asked for a pilot episode which the writers thought was unnecessary in the light of the earlier series. The revived series ended up being produced by the BBC for Gold.

== Home media release ==
On 25 February 2013, the revival series was commercially released for the first time on DVD. Titled Yes, Prime Minister with a caption "New for 2013" on the front cover, the DVD was distributed by 2 entertain.

== See also ==
- House of Cards
- The Thick of It
- Politics in fiction
- List of fictional prime ministers of the United Kingdom
