= Diana Hoddinott =

English actress (born 1941)

- Born: 1941 (age 84–85); Wincanton, Somerset, England
- Occupation: Actress
- Spouse: Harry Towb (m. 1965; died 2009)
- Children: 3

Diana M Hoddinott (born 1941) is an English actress.

She is best known for playing Annie Hacker, the wife of Jim Hacker, in the television comedy serials Yes Minister and Yes, Prime Minister. She also had a role in the historical film, The Gathering Storm, as Mrs Landemare, the Churchills' housekeeper at Chartwell House.

== Biography ==
Hoddinott was born at Wincanton, Somerset, the daughter of Winifred (née Dibble) (1909–2003) and Alan Hoddinott (1907–1985). She was married to fellow actor Harry Towb from 1965 until his death in July 2009. They had three children.

== Filmography ==
- The Inspector Lynley Mysteries (2004)
- The Gathering Storm (2002)
- The Man Who Cried (2000)
- Screen Two (1989)
- Yes Minister (1980-1984) and Yes, Prime Minister (1986-1988)
- Girl Stroke Boy (1971)
- Dixon of Dock Green (1971)
- The Wednesday Play (1966-1968)
- Sergeant Cork (1966)
- Maigret (1963)
- ITV Play of the Week (1963)
