= False premise =

Incorrect proposition that forms the basis of an argument

A false premise is an incorrect proposition that forms the basis of an argument or syllogism. Since the premise (proposition, or assumption) is not correct, the conclusion drawn may be in error. However, the logical validity of an argument is a function of its internal consistency, not the truth value of its premises.

For example, consider this syllogism, which involves a false premise:

- If the streets are wet, it must have rained recently. (premise)
- The streets are wet. (premise)
- Therefore it has rained recently. (conclusion)

This argument is logically valid, but quite demonstrably wrong, because its first premise is false — a street cleaner may have passed, the local river could have flooded, etc. A simple logical analysis will not reveal the error in this argument, since that analysis must accept the truth of the argument's premises. For this reason, an argument based on false premises can be much more difficult to refute, or even discuss, than one featuring a normal logical error, as the truth of its premises must be established to the satisfaction of all parties.

Another feature of an argument based on false premises that can bedevil critics, is that its conclusion can in fact be true. Consider the above example again. It may well be that it has recently rained and that the streets are wet. This does nothing to prove the first premise, but can make its claims more difficult to refute. This underlies the basic epistemological problem of establishing causal relationships.

Large language models often fail to appropriately answer questions based on false premises, but can be trained to respond correctly.

== See also ==
- Premise
- Co-premise
- Inference objection
