= Bernard Woolley =

Fictional character from the British sitcom Yes Minister

Bernard Woolley MA (Oxon)
- Derek Fowlds as Bernard Woolley in Yes, Prime Minister
- First appearance: "Open Government"
- Last appearance: "The Tangled Web"
- Portrayed by: Derek Fowlds (original); Chris Larkin (2013 revival)

In-universe information
- Occupation: Principal Private Secretary, Permanent Secretary

Bernard Woolley, MA (Oxon) is one of the three main fictional characters of the 1980s British sitcom Yes Minister and its sequel, Yes, Prime Minister. He is a civil servant, working as Minister (later Prime Minister) Jim Hacker's Principal Private Secretary.

While his role is to support Hacker, Woolley’s innate honesty and belief in public duty frequently place him in awkward positions, as he struggles with the pressure to sometimes obfuscate or even manipulate information at the behest of both Hacker and Sir Humphrey Appleby, his boss. This makes Woolley the moral compass of the series, subtly highlighting the ethical challenges within government. His humour, typically delivered with dry wit and subtle irony, often serves to lighten tense moments and highlights the absurdities within the government’s bureaucracy.

He was originally portrayed by Derek Fowlds in the two series. In 2013, Chris Larkin took on the role for a brief revival.

== Fictional biography ==
Woolley is the Principal Private Secretary to the Minister for Administrative Affairs (a fictional office), and later Prime Minister, Jim Hacker. However, his loyalties are split between his Minister and his Civil Service boss, Sir Humphrey Appleby. Whilst he is theoretically accountable to Hacker personally, it is Sir Humphrey who writes his performance reviews and apparently wields influence over Bernard's future in the Civil Service, leading to difficult situations for the young civil servant. When Hacker asks his Private Secretary where his loyalty would lie when the chips were down, Woolley replies, "Minister, it's my job to see the chips stay up."

His background is not revealed to any great extent, though it is revealed that he, like Sir Humphrey, is an Oxford graduate. In Episode 4 of Series 3 of Yes Minister, and Episode 5 of Series 1 of Yes, Prime Minister, Woolley is shown wearing a Magdalen College, Oxford tie, suggesting that he attended that college. (The novelisation, in an apparent mistake, refers to Bernard at one point as a graduate of Cambridge, but later follows the series in confirming that he attended Oxford. There is, however, no problem in suggesting that he attended both.) In addition, several areas of specialist knowledge surface from time to time: one example arises in "The Greasy Pole" where, while discussing the possible political dangers of building a chemical facility in Liverpool (to manufacture the fictional compound "metadioxin"), Woolley is quick to remind Sir Humphrey that Greek, unlike Latin, has no ablative case. (Bernard may, like Sir Humphrey, have read Literae Humaniores, but equally a basic knowledge of Greek and Latin may merely suggest a standard classical schooling.)

As with the other principal characters in the series, both actor and character have the same date of birth. This means that Bernard is in his mid- to late-forties during the series. Bernard is also married: in the Yes, Prime Minister episode "The Key", he declares that he does not give the key to his house to his mother-in-law. However, his wife never appears in the series.

Woolley, like the Minister and Sir Humphrey, progresses through the series, especially in his understanding of political mastery. In the last scene of "The Tangled Web", the final episode of Yes, Prime Minister, Woolley, of his own accord, both saves Sir Humphrey from public embarrassment and gives Hacker a lasting weapon to use against him, by acquiring a tape of Sir Humphrey describing the British public in many unpleasant ways, spoken off the record after a radio interview. This act of service to the Prime Minister can be seen as the final result of many series' wrestling between the two competing loyalties. Throughout both series, Bernard is almost the only civil servant portrayed with any sense of conscience, seeking constantly to justify his actions to himself. In the final episode, therefore, he realises that his principal loyalty must be to Hacker, and his intervention in the crisis is crucial in saving Hacker's political reputation and in ensuring that the Cabinet Secretary, like any other civil servant, remains a "humble functionary".

=== Later career ===
In the novelisations of the series, it is stated that Bernard eventually rises to the post of Head of the Home Civil Service and is appointed a Knight Grand Cross of the Most Honourable Order of the Bath (GCB). The novels take the form of diaries written by Hacker and Sir Humphrey Appleby's personal papers (said to have been donated to Oxford University after his death). Bernard himself contributes in interviews with the authors, suggesting that he lives to at least 2024, the supposed publication date of the fifth and final book. However, in the 2023 stage play "I'm Sorry, Prime Minister, I Can't Quite Remember...", it states that Bernard died three years before the events of the play, which take place in 2023, putting his death in 2020 - the same year as Derek Fowlds' death.

== Character ==
Woolley is always quick to point out the physical impossibilities of Sir Humphrey's or Hacker's mixed metaphors. On many occasions Sir Humphrey describes Woolley as a "rising star" and "high flyer" of the Civil Service, though he once questions whether Bernard is "a high flyer or a low flyer supported by occasional gusts of wind."

In many episodes, Woolley plays a key role in helping Hacker try to advance his goals. He most often does this by explaining to Hacker the means of (and reasons behind) Sir Humphrey's obstructionism, as well as by suggesting possible solutions or workarounds. For example, in "Doing the Honours", it is Woolley's idea that leads to Hacker proposing a scheme that links national honours to departmental economies (though he is quick to remind the Minister that he did not suggest it, if asked). He seems to have studied past civil service actions in depth, occasionally recommending historically proven responses (such as the "Rhodesia Solution" for a potential arms scandal in "The Whisky Priest").

Woolley is often the source of exposition, serving as a proxy for the audience. His commonsense views lead him to ask apparently sensible questions of Sir Humphrey, which are generally used to demonstrate his superior's rather more counter-intuitive view of the situation. Much of the satire comes from the fact that Sir Humphrey's views are not just shared by other experienced civil servants but are taken completely for granted. Bernard's naïve questioning brings this out for the audience. In one such conversation, in "The Devil You Know", Bernard will not let the matter rest and eventually homes in on the heart of the issue. He begins the sentence, "But surely, in a democracy..." and is immediately dismissed by an exasperated Sir Humphrey. In "A Victory for Democracy", Bernard is genuinely outraged when he learns that the Foreign Office is conducting its own policy with little regard for the Prime Minister's wishes.

On the other hand, Bernard is frequently forced to hide something, at which point he tries to mimic Sir Humphrey's distinctive style of confusing never-ending sentences in order to play for time with the Minister. An example of him attempting to "walk the tightrope" in this way occurs in "The Skeleton in the Cupboard", when he has to conceal a betrayed confidence from Hacker. Although he becomes slightly more adept at this over time, he is clearly much less proficient. At other times, he follows Sir Humphrey's lead in defending the civil service's position: When asked by Hacker if "...all this is to prevent Cabinet from enacting its policies?", Woolley casually and earnestly replies, "Well, somebody's got to."
