= Chris Larkin =

British actor (born 1967)

- Born: Christopher Stephens; 19 June 1967 (age 59); Fitzrovia, London, England
- Education: London Academy of Music and Dramatic Art
- Occupation: Actor
- Years active: 1993–present
- Spouse: Victoria "Suki" Steadman (m. 2005)
- Children: 2
- Parents: Robert Stephens (father); Maggie Smith (mother)
- Relatives: Toby Stephens (brother); Beverley Cross (step-father); Patricia Quinn (step-mother) Anna-Louise Plowman (sister in-law)

Christopher Larkin Stephens (born 19 June 1967) is an English actor.

== Early life ==
Born Christopher Stephens on 19 June 1967 at Middlesex Hospital in London, Larkin is the elder son of actors Dame Maggie Smith and Sir Robert Stephens. His younger brother is actor Toby Stephens. Larkin revealed in an interview that he chose his stage name in order to distance himself from his famous parents, not wanting "to trade on the family connection", and selected "Larkin" in honor of his favorite poet, Philip Larkin.

== Career ==
Larkin trained at the London Academy of Music and Dramatic Art (LAMDA). He is best known for playing Hermann Göring in the film Hitler: The Rise of Evil, but also played Charles Darwin for the PBS series Evolution and the abolitionist William Wilberforce in the radio production of Grace Victorious. Larkin also played Captain Howard of the Marines in Peter Weir's Master and Commander: The Far Side of the World alongside Paul Bettany and Russell Crowe, and appeared in Valkyrie with Tom Cruise playing Sgt. Helm. Other film credits are Angels and Insects, Franco Zeffirelli's Jane Eyre and Tea with Mussolini, and Heroes and Villains directed by Selwyn Roberts.

Larkin played Cambridge, a minicab driver who went to university in series 1 and 2 of John Sullivan's Roger Roger for BBC1 and portrayed George Marston in Charles Sturridge's Shackleton for Channel Four. Larkin also appeared in the 2007 episode of Doctor Who "The Shakespeare Code" and the 2012 low-budget horror film The Facility (originally titled Guinea Pigs) directed by Ian Clark. He appeared in three episodes of the fourth season of Black Sails, starring his brother, Toby Stephens.

In 2013 he starred in the television revival of Yes, Prime Minister as Bernard Woolley, reprising the role he had played in the Gielgud Theatre in London's West End.

Other theatre credits include: Edgar in The Lady from Dubuque starring his mother, Maggie Smith, and directed by Anthony Page; Jopari in Nicholas Hytner's production of His Dark Materials at The National Theatre; The Whisky Taster by James Graham at the Bush Theatre, London; and the nationwide tour of Noises Off, directed by Lindsay Posner.

== Filmography ==
Year	Title	Role	Notes
1995	Angels & Insects	Robin Whitefield	
1996	Jane Eyre	Frederick Lynn	
1997	Highlander: The Series	Steven Keane	Episode: Forgive Us Our Trespasses
1997	Casualty	Adam Parker	Episode: What Friends Are For
1999	Tea with Mussolini	Major Gibson	
2001	The Six Wives of Henry VIII	Henry VIII	Miniseries
2002	Shackleton	George Marston	Miniseries
2003	Hitler: The Rise of Evil	Hermann Göring	Miniseries
2003	Master and Commander: The Far Side of the World	Captain Howard, Royal Marines	
2005	Mysterious Island	Atherton	TV movie
2007	Doctor Who	Lynley	Episode: The Shakespeare Code
2008	Marple	Gerald Wright	Episode: A Pocket Full of Rye
2008	Valkyrie	Sergeant Helm	
2011	Holby City	Leonard Dawking	Episode: Blue Valentine
2011, 2015, 2021	Doctors	Edward Roxburgh / Father Sebastian Wood / Richard Waters	3 episodes
2012	The Facility	Dr. Mansell	
2013	Yes, Prime Minister	Bernard Woolley	6 episodes
2015	The Program	John Wilcockson	
2016	Endeavour	Ivor Maddox	Episode: Arcadia
2016	Churchill's Secret	Rab Butler	TV movie
2017	Black Sails	Captain Berringer	3 episodes
2018	Father Brown	Roger Frobisher	Episode: The Devil You Know
2020–2023	Outlander	Richard Brown	Main role; 8 episodes
2023	Widow Clicquot	Muller	
