= Co-premise =

Secondary logical premise which is necessary for the main argument to be valid

A co-premise is a premise in reasoning and informal logic which is not the main supporting reason for a contention or a lemma, but is logically necessary to ensure the validity of an argument. One premise by itself, or a group of co-premises can form a reason.

== Logical structure ==
Every significant term or phrase appearing in a premise of a simple argument, should also appear in the contention/conclusion or in a co-premise. But this by itself does not guarantee a valid argument, see the fallacy of the undistributed middle for an example of this.

Sometimes a co-premise will not be explicitly stated. This type of argument is known as an 'enthymematic' argument, and the co-premise may be referred to as a 'hidden' or an 'unstated' co-premise and will often be subject to an inference objection. In this argument map of a simple argument the two reasons for the main contention are co-premises and not separate reasons for believing the contention to be true. They are both necessary to ensure that the argument as a whole retains logical validity.

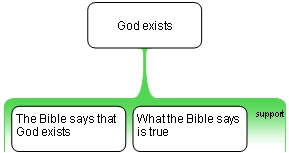

In this example, "What the Bible says is true" is a hidden co-premise.
