= Paul Eddington =

English actor (1927–1995)

Paul Eddington CBE
- Eddington, c. 1980s
- Born: Paul Clark Eddington; 18 June 1927; St John's Wood, London, England
- Died: 4 November 1995 (aged 68); Southwark, London, England
- Occupation: Actor
- Years active: 1940s–1995
- Spouse: Patricia Scott (m. 1952)
- Children: 4

Paul Clark Eddington (18 June 1927 – 4 November 1995) was an English actor who played Jerry Leadbetter in the television sitcom The Good Life (1975–1978) and politician Jim Hacker in the sitcom Yes Minister (1980–1984) and its sequel, Yes, Prime Minister (1986–1988). He was a four-time BAFTA TV and two-time Olivier Award nominee.

== Early life ==
Eddington was born in Paddington, London to decorative artist Albert Clark Eddington (1887–1955) and Frances Mary (née Roberts) (1898–1958). He was raised in St John's Wood. The family were Quakers. Albert Eddington was related to the Somerset shoemaking Clark family and the scientist Sir Arthur Eddington, Albert and Sir Arthur being second cousins, both great-grandsons of William Eddington (1755–1806).

Paul was brought up by his parents with strict family values. His father had been "emotionally shattered" on his return from the First World War, which led to Paul being a lifelong pacifist. He attended Sibford School in Sibford Ferris, Oxfordshire. In 1952, he married Patricia Scott.

== Career ==
Having registered as a conscientious objector, Eddington began his acting career as a teenager with ENSA during the Second World War. He worked for Sheffield Repertory Theatre, a theatre company based at Sheffield Playhouse. In 1956, he played his first major role on television as the corrupt policeman PC Tom Carr in the Dixon of Dock Green episode The Rotten Apple, and later that year he became a regular cast member of The Adventures of Robin Hood. Initially he played minor characters, but in the fourth series (1959–60), he played Will Scarlet.

He had a leading role in "Liberty Bar", a 1960 episode of the BBC version of Maigret, playing Harry Brown, an Australian entrepreneur. He had roles in episodes of The Avengers (1963), The Prisoner (1967) and the final episode of The Champions (1969). He was a main cast member of the television series Frontier (1968). He also had a supporting role in Hammer Films' The Devil Rides Out (1968), an episode of Van der Valk in 1972, and appeared as a "straight man" (substituting for regular stooge Henry McGee) in a 1976 episode of The Benny Hill Show. He also appeared in most episodes of the ATV series Hine (1971). In this he played Astor Harris, a member of an arms dealing firm named Pendles. Eddington appeared as civil servant Strand in the last series of Special Branch (1974).

=== Career peak ===
Although he was an actor for all his adult life, it was not until Eddington was in his late forties that he became a household name because of his role in The Good Life, first screened by the BBC in 1975, and written by John Esmonde and Bob Larbey. The sitcom focuses on a suburban couple who decide to give up conventionally paid work and become self-sufficient in their suburban garden. Eddington was cast as Jerry Leadbetter, a neighbour of the main characters, and Penelope Keith played his wife, Margo. Originally intended as small parts, the Leadbetters soon became essential foils for the two stars. He also appeared in a single episode of another Esmonde and Larbey sitcom, Get Some In! in 1977.

Eddington's profile was raised further when he played the title role of Jim Hacker in the comedy series Yes Minister (1980–1984) and Yes, Prime Minister (1986–1988). He was shortlisted four times for the BAFTA award for Best Light Entertainment Performance for the series, but he lost out to his co-star Nigel Hawthorne on each occasion.

During 1987 Eddington appeared as Sir Joseph Porter in H.M.S. Pinafore in Australia. His last roles included Guy Wheeler, a corrupt property developer in the Minder episode "The Wrong Goodbye" (1989); as Richard Cuthbertson alongside Good Life co-star Felicity Kendal in the TV dramatisation of The Camomile Lawn (1992); the voice of Badger in The Adventures of Mole and Justice Shallow in Henry IV (1995); a BBC adaptation of Shakespeare's Henry IV, Part 1 and Henry IV, Part 2. He was reunited with another Good Life co-star Richard Briers in a run of the play Home in 1994.

Eddington read extracts from Sir Winston Churchill's A History of the English-Speaking Peoples for the award-winning BBC Radio series This Sceptred Isle; he died midway through the production, and his place was taken by Peter Jeffrey.

=== Awards and honours ===
Eddington was made a Commander of the Order of the British Empire (CBE) in the 1987 New Year Honours.

Year	Work	Awards	Category	Result	Ref.
1982	Noises Off	Laurence Olivier Awards	Best Comedy Performance	Nominated	
1982	Yes Minister	British Academy Television Awards	Best Light Entertainment Performance	Nominated	
1983	Yes Minister / Let There Be Love	British Academy Television Awards	Best Light Entertainment Performance	Nominated	
1987	Yes, Prime Minister	British Academy Television Awards	Best Light Entertainment Performance	Nominated	
1988	Yes, Prime Minister	British Academy Television Awards	Best Light Entertainment Performance	Nominated	
1993	No Man's Land	Laurence Olivier Awards	Best Actor	Nominated	

== Final years and death ==
Eddington's autobiography, So Far, So Good, was published in 1995. On 30 October 1995, five days before Eddington's death, the BBC aired an edition of Face to Face in which he discussed his life, career and battle with lymphoma. On that show he was asked how he would like to be remembered:

A journalist once asked me what I would like my epitaph to be and I said I think I would like it to be, 'He did very little harm'. And that's not easy. Most people seem to me to do a great deal of harm. If I could be remembered as having done very little, that would suit me.

Eddington had been diagnosed with a rare form of cancer, known as mycosis fungoides, when he was 28. The ailment was to cause his death eventually, but in the intervening four decades, Eddington and his immediate family kept his condition private. It only became public knowledge in 1994, when Eddington responded to press speculation about his darkening skin and hair loss. He said “I’d always had a little bit of cancer but now I have the real thing, it is exciting somehow.”

Eddington died in Southwark, London, on 4 November 1995. He and Patricia, his wife of 43 years, had three sons and a daughter.

== Selected filmography ==
Year	Title	Role	Notes
1956	Dixon of Dock Green	PC Tom Carr	Episode: The Rotten Apple
1956	The Secret of the Forest	Museum tour leader	
1956	Sailor Beware!	Bearded Sailor	Uncredited
1956–1960	The Adventures of Robin Hood	Various roles/ Will Scarlet	64 episodes
1957	Kenilworth	Edmund Tressilian	6 episodes
1958	Ivanhoe	Robber Chief	Episode: The Widow of Woodcote
1958	The Diary of Samuel Pepys	Sir William Coventry	8 episodes
1959	Television Playwright	Selwyn Roberts	Episode: High Fidelity
1959	The Adventures of Brigadier Wellington-Bull	Harry, another Soho type	Episode: A Clubbable Man
1959	Jet Storm	Victor Tracer	
1959	Desert Mice	Army Officer	Uncredited
1960	Maigret	Harry Brown	Episode: Liberty Bar
1960	The Four Just Men	Rustie	Episode: Crack-Up
1960	The Man Who Was Nobody	Franz Reuter	
1961	Seven Faces of Jim	Col. Downs	Episode: The Face of Genius
1961	The Escape of R.D.7	Michael Rabinowitz	2 episodes
1963	The Avengers	Richard Marling	Episode: Immortal Clay
1963	The Spread of the Eagle	Marcus Brutus	TV mini-series, 3 episodes
1963	Z-Cars	Stan Ferris	Episode: Act of Vengeance
1964	Ring of Spies	Johnnie	Uncredited
1966	Danger Man	Captain Shulman	Episode: I'm Afraid You Have The Wrong Number
1967	Half Hour Story	Tim Phipps-Arnold	Quick on the Takeover
1967	The Avengers	Beaumont	Episode: Something Nasty in the Nursery
1967	The Prisoner	Cobb	Episode: Arrival
1968	Frontier	Hamilton Lovelace	8 episodes
1968	The Devil Rides Out	Richard Eaton	
1969	Fraud Squad	Joseph Horden	Episode: The Biggest Borrower of All
1969	The Champions	Klein	Episode: Autokill
1970	Doomwatch	Reynolds	Episode: The Red Sky
1971	Catweazel	Vandanti	Episode: The Heavenly Twins
1971	Hine	Astor Harris	9 episodes
1971	The Rivals of Sherlock Holmes	Hamer	Episode: The Case of the Mirror of Portugal
1972	Man at the Top	Clive Kempson	3 episodes
1972	The Amazing Mr Blunden	Vicar	
1972	Van der Valk	Wolf Gebhardt	Episode: The Adventurer
1972	Villains	Henry Percival	2 episodes
1973	Baxter!	Mr Rawling	
1974	Fall of Eagles	George Plekhanov	TV mini-series, 1 episode
1974	Special Branch	Strand	11 episodes
1974–1978	The Good Life	Jerry Leadbetter	30 episodes
1975	Play for Today	Varley	Goodbye
1977	Get Some In!	Squadron-Leader Bush	Episode: End of Basic Training
1980–1984	Yes Minister	James Hacker	22 episodes
1982	Outside Edge	Roger	Television film
1982–1983	Let There Be Love	Timothy Love	12 episodes
1984	Hay Fever	David Bliss	Television film
1986	Miss Marple	Rev. Leonard Clement	Episode: Murder at the Vicarage
1986–1988	Yes Prime Minister	James Hacker	16 episodes
1989	Minder	Guy Wheeler	Episode: The Wrong Goodbye
1992	The Camomile Lawn	Richard	TV mini-series, 5 episodes
1995	Performance	Justice Shallow	Henry IV Part 1 & Part 2
