= Humphrey Appleby =

British sitcom character

Sir Humphrey Appleby GCB KBE MVO
- Nigel Hawthorne as Appleby
- First appearance: "Open Government"
- Last appearance: "The Tangled Web"
- Portrayed by: Sir Nigel Hawthorne (original); Henry Goodman (2013 revival)

In-universe information
- Alias: Humpy
- Title: Sir
- Occupation: Permanent Secretary / Cabinet Secretary / Master of Baillie College
- Spouse: Lady Appleby

Sir Humphrey Appleby is a fictional character from the British television series Yes Minister and Yes, Prime Minister. He was played originally by Sir Nigel Hawthorne, and both on stage and in a television adaptation of the stage show by Henry Goodman in a new series of Yes, Prime Minister. In Yes Minister, he is the Permanent Secretary for the Department of Administrative Affairs (a fictional department of the British government). In the last episode of Yes Minister, "Party Games", he becomes Cabinet Secretary, the most powerful position in the service and one he retains during Yes, Prime Minister. Hawthorne's portrayal won the British Academy Television Awards Award for Best Light Entertainment Performance four times: 1981, 1982, 1986 and 1987.

== Fictional biography ==
Sir Humphrey was educated at Winchester College and Baillie College, Oxford, where he read literae humaniores and received a first. (Baillie College is clearly based on Balliol College, Oxford; Humphrey is frequently seen wearing a Balliol tie.) After National Service in the Army Education Corps, he entered the Civil Service. From 1950 to 1956 he was successively the Regional Contracts Officer, an assistant principal in the Scottish Office, on secondment from the War Office (where, as revealed in "The Skeleton in the Cupboard", he was responsible for the relinquishing of £40 million worth of military installations due to a lack of understanding of Scottish law). In 1964, he was brought into the newly formed Department of Administrative Affairs, where he worked until his appointment as Cabinet Secretary. He is recommended for a KBE award early on in the series in "The Official Visit". The Dean of Baillie Rev. Christopher Smythe reportedly described him as "too clever by half" and "smug" ("The Bishop's Gambit"). Coincidentally, in the same episode Humphrey is secretly instrumental in having the Dean removed from his position at Baillie College and appointed by the Prime Minister and the Palace to the bishopric of Bury St. Edmunds after Humphrey is informed by the current Master and the Bursar that they both want Humphrey to be the next Master of Baillie College (upon Humphrey's retirement from the Civil Service in four/five years) and the Dean is the only thing standing in the way of that.

On Humphrey's possible private situation, Jonathan Lynn, one of the creators of Yes Minister and Yes, Prime Minister, commented: "We always supposed that Sir Humphrey lived in Haslemere, had a son at Winchester and a daughter at Bedales and that his wife was a sensible woman who made cakes for church socials and enjoyed walking the family bulldog. I think that Humphrey's hobbies were reading (mainly biographies), listening to classical music, and occasionally visiting the RSC, the National Theatre or the Royal Opera House, where he was on the Board. His holidays were probably spent walking in the Lake District and, occasionally, sailing in Lymington. On the whole, he had a slightly warmer relationship with his dog than his family."

The book adaptation of the first series was published in 1981, but with a fictional publication date of 2017. In the foreword, the 'editors' Lynn and Jay state that they had "a few conversations" with Sir Humphrey before the "advancing years, without in any way impairing his verbal fluency, disengaged the operation of his mind from the content of his speech," indicating that his speech had transitioned from merely sounding like overly verbose nonsense to actually being overly verbose nonsense. The third volume (published 1983, but dated September 2019) notes that the editors learned from "the few lucid moments of Sir Humphrey Appleby's last ravings" at St Dymphna's Hospital for the Elderly Deranged. The fifth and final volume (published 1987, dated May 2024) makes it explicit that Sir Humphrey is dead and thanks his widow for her cooperation. Politico's Book of the Dead states that Sir Humphrey (like Nigel Hawthorne) died in 2001.

=== Honours ===
Sir Humphrey has been appointed a Knight Grand Cross of the Order of the Bath (GCB), a Knight Commander of the Order of the British Empire (KBE) and a Member of the Royal Victorian Order (MVO).

== Character ==
Sir Humphrey is a master of obfuscation and manipulation, often making long-winded statements to confuse and fatigue the listener. An example is the following monologue, delivered to Jim Hacker in the episode "The Death List": "In view of the somewhat nebulous and inexplicit nature of your remit, and the arguably marginal and peripheral nature of your influence within the central deliberations and decisions within the political process, there could be a case for restructuring their action priorities in such a way as to eliminate your liquidation from their immediate agenda." This signifies that a terrorist group has abandoned its plans to assassinate Hacker, because he is too politically unimportant to make a good target.

Sir Humphrey appears outwardly conservative; in "Doing the Honours", he criticises Hacker's proposal to link honours for civil servants in his department with cuts of five per cent in the administration budget as a "Bennite solution", likely in reference to Tony Benn. However, he will stop at nothing to prevent positive or rational changes to his department, or even changes outside of his department that would provide a "dangerous" precedent. He will both feign sympathy and strike alliances even with the far left in order to maintain the status quo in his own career and for the Civil Service bureaucracy in particular. In "The Compassionate Society", when Hacker learns that health budget cuts resulted in the St Edmund's Hospital opening with nearly 500 administrators but no medical staff, Humphrey arranges the transfer of firebrand trade union leader Billy Fraser to the hospital to ensure strike action against Hacker's proposals to replace 300 administrative staff with doctors and nurses or to close down St Edmund's to reopen other wards and hospitals.

After decades of working in a bureaucracy, Sir Humphrey knows how to baffle his opponents with obfuscation and routinely employs what his previous Minister calls "creative inertia" (meaning a dizzying array of sociopathic blocking and delaying tactics). He often conceals vital documents underneath mammoth piles of papers and reports, strategically appoints allies to supposedly impartial boards or offers to set up an interdepartmental committee to indefinitely block his Minister's proposals, and occasionally lies outright. Throughout the series, he serves as Permanent Secretary at the Department of Administrative Affairs, with Jim Hacker as minister; he is appointed Cabinet Secretary shortly before Hacker's elevation to the role of Prime Minister, which he was instrumental in bringing to pass.

Sir Humphrey frequently uses both his mastery of the English language and even his superb grasp of Latin and Classical Greek grammar to perplex his political masters and to obscure relevant issues under discussion. His habit of using language as a tool of confusion and obstruction seems so deeply ingrained that he is sometimes unable to speak clearly and directly even when he wishes to do so. However, he has also employed this ironically in response to Hacker questioning (usually out of shock or confusion) any plain-spoken comment that he makes. He genuinely believes that the Civil Service knows what the average person needs and is the most qualified body to run the country. The joke being, however, that Sir Humphrey, as an elite, University of Oxford-educated career civil servant, is actually quite out of touch from the average Briton.

His minister Hacker, on the other hand, tends to regard what is best for Britain as being whatever is best at the moment for his political party or his own chances of re-election. As a result, Sir Humphrey and Hacker often clash.

Sir Humphrey still holds women to be the fairer sex and is thus overly courteous, frequently addressing them as "dear lady", while expressing contempt for female civil servants behind their backs and blocking their chances of promotion at every turn. Like Hacker, Sir Humphrey has expensive tastes and is regularly seen drinking sherry and dining at gourmet restaurants, often with his fellow civil servant Sir Arnold Robinson, who was Cabinet Secretary throughout Yes Minister. Sir Humphrey is also on the board of governors of the National Theatre and attends many of the gala nights of the Royal Opera House. His interests also extend to cricket, theatre, classical music and the arts.

Humphrey is usually smooth, calm and collected within his element of manipulating both bureaucracy and procedure, but his adeptness at working within and maintaining the system of government has led to a certain mental inflexibility. When anything unexpected is sprung on him — for instance, Hacker ordering him to negotiate with the leader of Hounslow Council who is violating legal obligations in pursuit of a radical vision for government, or proposing that honours in his department be awarded on a meritocratic basis — he crumbles immediately. In such moments, before he composes himself and can argue coherently, he is sometimes reduced to stuttering out garbled platitudes such as "the thin end of the wedge", "the beginning of the end", or "it cuts at the very roots". In "The Tangled Web", after being interviewed for a BBC radio documentary on government function, Humphrey indiscreetly reveals to the interviewer his views on employment policy, unaware that he was being recorded; after a tape of this outtake is sent to Humphrey, he is forced to plead with Bernard to remedy the situation and the master tape of the incident is ultimately used by Hacker to blackmail him.

In a Radio Times interview to promote the first series of Yes, Prime Minister, Nigel Hawthorne observed, "He's raving mad of course. Obsessive about his job. He'd do anything to keep control. In fact, he does go mad in one episode. Quite mad."

== Relationships ==
In Yes Minister, Sir Humphrey maintains a civil and outwardly deferential but fundamentally adversarial relationship with his new minister, Jim Hacker. When keeping Hacker busy is not sufficient to prevent him from proposing new policy, Sir Humphrey is not above deceiving or even blackmailing him. He frequently quashes unwelcome proposals by describing them as "very brave" or "extremely courageous", playing upon Hacker's fear as a politician of anything which may fly in the face of prevailing public opinion.

He has a slightly more amicable relationship with his subordinate, the Minister's Principal Private Secretary, Bernard Woolley. He frequently lectures the naïve Woolley in the realities of political matters. When Woolley's loyalty to the Minister is inconvenient to Sir Humphrey's plans, he readily makes oblique threats about Woolley's job prospects should he defy Sir Humphrey. However, he is equally quick to defend Woolley from outsiders. His closest on-screen friendships are with Sir Arnold Robinson, Cabinet Secretary during Yes Minister; Sir Frederick "Jumbo" Stewart, Permanent Secretary of the Foreign and Commonwealth Office; and the banker Sir Desmond Glazebrook. He is sometimes called 'Humpy" by his friends. He is married, although his wife plays virtually no role in either series and is only seen once: next to him in bed in the Series One episode "Big Brother".

In the 2013 series, Humphrey is mentioned as having a daughter. Her attendance at a prestigious riding school is referenced when Hacker and his advisor Claire Sutton highlight numerous instances of inappropriate spending by civil servants.

== Real-life references ==
Sir Humphrey has become a stereotype associated with civil servants: the phrase "Bowler-hatted Sir Humphreys" is sometimes used when describing their image. Satirical and investigative magazine Private Eye often refers to Sir Humphrey with the definite article "the" to indicate someone in the civil service the magazine considers of similar character, e.g. "[name] is the present Sir Humphrey at the Department for Rural Affairs". Jonathan Lynn wrote in his book Comedy Rules (2011) that Sir Humphrey was named after a friend of his at Cambridge, Humphrey Barclay.

A spoof obituary for Sir Humphrey appears in Politico's Book of the Dead, written by his creators, Antony Jay and Jonathan Lynn, which includes some biographical details, including dates of birth and death, which he shares with Nigel Hawthorne, the actor who portrayed him.

Sir Humphrey was voted the 45th greatest comedy character in Channel 4's 2007 "The World's Greatest Comedy Characters" poll. He was also voted 31st in a poll of "100 Greatest TV Characters", also on Channel 4. Upon Nigel Hawthorne's death, the following appeared on the Editorial page of The Ottawa Citizen under the heading "No, Minister":

"It is sadly that we report on Sir Nigel Hawthorne, elsewhere referred to as Sir Humphrey Appleby. While it would be premature to commit ourselves to a definitive position on his merits or even his existence, a committee is being struck to consider the possibility of a decision, in the fullness of time, to regret his passing, if any."

The character was resurrected for the 2010 general election campaign in a series of short sketches on BBC Two's late evening current affairs programme Newsnight. The sketches were written by Jay and Lynn, and Sir Humphrey was played by Henry Goodman.

Goodman also played the part of Sir Humphrey in the 2010 stage production of Yes, Prime Minister.

Humphrey, a cat employed as the Chief Mouser to the Cabinet Office at 10 Downing Street from 1989 to 1997, was named after Sir Humphrey.

In January 2025, the British government announced that a new collection of artificial intelligence tools aimed at helping civil servants with their work would be called Humphrey.
