= Jim Hacker =

Fictional character from the British sitcom Yes Minister

- Hacker, as portrayed by Paul Eddington, in Yes, Prime Minister
- First appearance: "Open Government"
- Last appearance: "The Tangled Web"
- Portrayed by: Paul Eddington (original); David Haig (2013 revival)

In-universe information
- Occupation: Lecturer; Member of Parliament for Birmingham East; Journalist; Party chairman (Note: The name of Hacker's political party was never revealed); Minister for Administrative Affairs; Prime Minister of the United Kingdom
- Spouse: Annie Hacker
- Children: Lucy Hacker plus possible unknown others
- Nationality: British

James George Hacker, Baron Hacker of Islington, KG, PC, BSc (LSE), Hon. D.Phil. (Oxon.) is a fictional character in the 1980s British sitcom Yes Minister and Yes, Prime Minister. He is the minister of the fictional Department of Administrative Affairs, and later Prime Minister of the United Kingdom. He was portrayed originally by Paul Eddington, with David Haig taking on the part for the 2013 revival.

== Fictional biography ==
=== Before Yes Minister ===
Hacker attended the London School of Economics (around 25 years before his appointment to the cabinet) and graduated with a third class honours degree. He had a career in political research, university lecturing and journalism – including editorship of a publication named Reform – and was elected as a Member of Parliament, initially serving as a backbencher.

While his party was in opposition, Hacker served for seven years as Shadow Minister of Agriculture. During an internal contest for leadership of his party, Hacker ran the campaign of his colleague Martin Walker, but this was unsuccessful, leaving Hacker with a strained relationship with the party leader.

=== Yes Minister ===
When Hacker was in his late 40s, his party won a general election victory, with Hacker himself being re-elected in the Birmingham East constituency with an increased majority. Hacker expected to be appointed Minister of Agriculture, due to his extensive knowledge of the subject, but the Civil Service, for the same reason, encouraged the new prime minister to appoint him elsewhere. Hacker was appointed Minister of Administrative Affairs. The Department of Administrative Affairs (DAA) was described by a commentator as a "political graveyard", implying the prime minister may have chosen it as an act of revenge, likely due to Hacker's management of the prime minister's rival's campaign during their party's last leadership election.

Hacker worked with the ministry's permanent secretary, Sir Humphrey Appleby, who as a senior civil servant tries to control the ministry and the minister himself, and his own principal private secretary, Bernard Woolley.

Hacker had been helped in his re-election by political adviser Frank Weisel, saying of him, "I depend on him more than anyone." Initially, Hacker brought Weisel with him to the DAA, but his presence was resented by the civil servants, who referred to him as "the weasel" (derived from an obstinate mispronunciation of the name Weisel, which Frank often corrects on screen). Eventually, Hacker and Weisel came to conflict when Weisel proposed reforming the quango system, as he put it, "ending the scandal of ministerial patronage". Sir Humphrey arranged a situation where Hacker could avoid a scandal only by appointing an unqualified candidate to chair such a quango. When Hacker agreed, Weisel was disgusted and threatened to go to the press, but instead accepted Hacker's offer of heading a well compensated "super-quango" on the abolition of quangos. This left Hacker to be advised entirely by civil servants for the remainder of his time at the DAA.

Hacker hoped for promotion to a more prestigious Cabinet post, such as Foreign Secretary. He considered the "top jobs" to be Foreign Secretary, Chancellor of the Exchequer and Home Secretary, and dreaded the prospect of being made Secretary of State for Northern Ireland or Minister with General Responsibility for Industrial Harmony. The prime minister still saw Hacker as a supporter of his rival, Martin Walker, and at one point almost abolished the Department of Administrative Affairs, in which case Hacker may have been "kicked upstairs" to the House of Lords. Hacker was able to blackmail the prime minister into abandoning the idea. However, fearing demotion in an upcoming Cabinet reshuffle, he seriously considered accepting an offer to become an EEC Commissioner, a move he considered to be "curtains as far as British politics is concerned. It's worse than a peerage... You're reduced to forming a new party if ever you want to get back," in reference to Roy Jenkins. Sir Humphrey persuaded Hacker to refuse the offer, and Hacker remained Minister of Administrative Affairs. Following the prime minister's resignation, Hacker was offered the roles of Chancellor of the Exchequer and Foreign Secretary by the respective incumbents in bids to secure his support in a leadership contest; however, Bernard dissuaded Hacker from excepting either offer, arguing that neither would make him popular with the British public, with Hacker balking at the idea of becoming Home Secretary for similar reasons.

Hacker was pleased to take on additional responsibilities while remaining at the same department, including the role of "Transport Supremo", responsible for an integrated transport policy (although this was a highly contentious issue that not even the Department of Transport wanted to deal with owing to the risk of alienating sectors of the industry through preferential treatment), and responsibility for the arts (although this was a ploy to prevent Hacker from organising the sale of an unpopular art gallery in his constituency to save its local football team from bankruptcy). Following a cabinet reshuffle, his department absorbed the Local Authority Directorate.

Hacker was awarded an honorary doctorate of Law from Baillie College, Oxford (a possible reference to Balliol College), in return for allowing them to continue taking overseas students and abandoning his policy of making the rewarding of honours to civil servants at the DAA dependent on cuts of five per cent to the administration budget.

Hacker was appointed Chair of his party. When he had held this position for less than a year, and been a minister for two, the prime minister unexpectedly retired following the resignation of the Home Secretary due to a drink-driving scandal (but which Hacker himself surmised was the result of the prime minister merely wishing to deny the premiership to his then deputy). With the two likely successors to the party leadership, the chancellor and the Foreign Secretary, being significant security risks, Sir Humphrey, who was now Cabinet Secretary, encouraged and assisted Hacker in using the position of Chair to his advantage, resulting in Hacker becoming party leader unchallenged and thus prime minister.

=== Yes, Prime Minister ===
Although Hacker had believed the prime minister had more freedom to act than Cabinet ministers, he found that in his new role Sir Humphrey was still able to prevent him implementing many of his ideas. Early in his premiership, Hacker intended to implement what he called his "Grand Design" – actually the idea of the Chief Scientific Adviser – which involved cancelling the Trident missile programme, enlarging the armed forces and reintroducing conscription. Sir Humphrey, through the Permanent Secretaries of the various departments, was able to persuade the Cabinet to oppose the scheme.

The former prime minister posed a problem for Hacker by describing him unflatteringly in his memoirs. Hacker was delighted by his sudden death, not only because the memoirs would not be finished, but because the funeral offered the opportunity for him to host an unofficial summit of world leaders, during which he discussed with the French president the terms of joint British-French management of the Channel Tunnel.

Notable policies that Hacker supported throughout the series have included:

- The sale of the National Theatre building so that the institution could spend more of its budget on productions rather than building maintenance and become truly national by operating out of provincial theatres and low-cost rented offices (albeit as a bargaining chip intended to deter its director from criticising the government in a public speech).
- His Health Secretary's aggressive ameliorative anti-smoking plan involving the banning of tobacco advertising and increasing taxes on tobacco to sumptuary levels (albeit as a bargaining chip to persuade the Civil Service to agree to one-and-a-half billion pounds' worth of budget cuts so as to avoid the loss of four billion pounds in revenue).
- The establishment of a National Education Service and the abolition of the Department of Education (but backed down after learning from Humphrey that the school which he intended to model his education reforms on had stolen materials for its woodworking classes).
- Reforming local government so that local boroughs were elected by districts of two-hundred households each, effectively being granted their own parliaments and cabinets (but backed down after learning from the plan's proponent, Professor Marriott, that it would, if applied to Westminster, result in the collapse of party discipline and prevent the passage of unpopular but necessary legislation).
- The relocation of military bases from the South of England to the North to create jobs (which was unsuccessfully challenged by the Civil Service and the General Staff through the fabrication of a leadership challenge by the Employment Secretary).

=== After Yes, Prime Minister ===
The original television series ended in 1988 with Hacker still in office as prime minister; however, both before and after this, writers Antony Jay and Jonathan Lynn made references to Hacker's career in print which reveal his life after the series ended.

In 1981, Jay and Lynn adapted the first series of Yes Minister into book form, presenting it in the form of Hacker's diaries, ostensibly edited by Jay and Lynn more than thirty years later in 2017. In summarizing his career, they say that he "failed upwards from one senior cabinet post to the next, culminating with his ultimate failure at Number Ten and his final demise on his elevation to the House of Lords (as it then was)." This would be partly contradicted by the 1984 episode "Party Games", as Hacker does not hold any other cabinet post between being Minister for Administrative Affairs and becoming prime minister.

The foreword to the third volume of the book series (published 1983, but dated September 2019) makes clear that Hacker has died, not merely suffered a political demise. All five volumes of the book series are supposedly written at "Hacker College, Oxford", an institution apparently named after him.

In 2003, Jay and Lynn wrote an obituary for Hacker for The Politico's Book of the Dead. It gives his dates of birth and death as 18 June 1927 and 4 November 1995, the same as Paul Eddington, the actor who portrayed him. The obituary states that Hacker was Minister of Administrative Affairs (the events of the three series of Yes Minister) for a period of two years. His time as prime minister is also described as brief, finishing in a general election defeat for his party. Despite re-election being Hacker's main motivation throughout the series, it appears that he was in government for only a single term, a maximum of five years.

The obituary confirms that Hacker was elevated to the House of Lords, taking the title Lord Hacker of Islington, and also reveals that he was made a Knight Companion of the Order of the Garter. Both are customary retirement honours for former prime ministers. Hacker is described as an "Hon. D. Phil", indicating that his honorary law degree from Baillie college was as a Doctor of Philosophy rather than Doctor of Civil Law.

=== Personal life ===
Hacker and his wife, Annie, are seen to have one daughter, Lucy, a left-wing activist and sociology student at the University of Sussex. Hacker mentions having more than one child, saying, "Our children are reaching the age where Annie and I are hoping to spend much more time with each other."

== Character ==
Jim Hacker first appears in Yes Minister having been recently re-elected as Member of Parliament for Birmingham East, soundly defeating his opponents. His early character is that of a very gung-ho, albeit naïve, politician, ready to bring sweeping change into his department, unaware that Sir Humphrey and the civil service are out to stop any semblance of change, despite their insistence that they are his allies. Hacker is also noted as having challenged Humphrey while he was a member of the Opposition by asking difficult questions when Sir Humphrey was testifying to a Parliamentary committee: Sir Humphrey stated that Hacker had asked "...all the questions I hoped nobody would ask," showing his new Minister to be at least a reasonably capable politician.

Before long, Hacker begins to notice that the Civil Service has been preventing any of his changes from actually being put into practice, referring to them as 'The Opposition-in-residence'. Bernard is sympathetic to Hacker's plight and tries to enlighten his Minister as to the tricks and techniques employed by government staff, but his ability to help is limited by his own loyalties in the Civil Service. Hacker soon learns and becomes more sly and cynical, using some of these ploys himself. While Sir Humphrey nearly always gets the upper hand, Hacker now and again plays a trump card, and on even fewer occasions, the two of them work towards a common goal.

Hacker also learns that his efforts to change the government or Britain are all really for naught, as he discovers in the episode "The Whisky Priest", when he attempts to stop the export of British-made munitions to Italian terrorists.

Throughout Yes Minister, there are many occasions when Hacker is portrayed as a publicity-mad bungler, incapable of making a firm decision, and prone to blunders that embarrass him or his party, eliciting bad press and stern lectures from the party apparatus, particularly the Chief Whip. He is continually concerned with what the newspapers of the day will have to say about him, and is always hoping to be promoted by the prime minister (Hacker ran the unsuccessful campaign for a political ally during the party's last leadership election – his man lost, becoming Foreign Secretary, and leaving Hacker nervous about his prospects under the winner, now prime minister). He is equally afraid of either staying at his current level of Cabinet seniority, or being demoted.

Just prior to the start of Yes, Prime Minister, Hacker shows a zeal for making speeches and presents himself as a viable party leader after the prime minister announces his resignation in the episode "Party Games". He is given embarrassing information about the two front-runner candidates, and manages to persuade them (by insinuating that secret information pertaining to both may be revealed to the public) to drop out of the race, and lend their support to him. With help from the recently promoted Sir Humphrey and other senior civil servants, Hacker emerges as a compromise candidate and becomes head of his party unopposed – and prime minister.

In Yes, Prime Minister, Hacker strives to perfect all the skills needed by a statesman, giving more grandiose speeches, dreaming up "courageous" political programmes, and honing his diplomatic craft, nearly all of these attempts landing him in trouble at some point.

In a Radio Times interview to promote the latter series, Paul Eddington stated, "He's beginning to find his feet as a man of power, and he's begun to confound those who thought they'd be able to manipulate him out of hand."

Hacker becomes a more competent politician by the end. Though primarily interested in his personal career survival and advancement, he, unlike Sir Humphrey, views government as a means rather than an end in itself.

== Interests and habits ==
Hacker has many prominent habits that feature throughout the series:

- Drinking. Hacker enjoys various alcoholic beverages, particularly harder liquors, including Scotch whisky: "the odd drinkie", as he likes to call them. He is seen drunk on more than one occasion and was caught drinking and driving in the episode "Party Games". He used his political immunity to escape charges. He (teaming up with Sir Humphrey) even went as far as to smuggle alcohol into a diplomatic function in Qumran (a dry Islamic oil sheikhdom) by establishing a false diplomatic communications room in The Moral Dimension.
- Disdain for certain types of culture. Sir Humphrey thinks Hacker to be a cultural philistine who is unaware of the importance of protecting Britain's artistic heritage. Hacker believes it only important to the "upper-class snobs" (such as Humphrey himself), and several other "wet, long-haired, scruffy art lovers", arguing that operas created by Italians and Germans are not representative of Britain's cultural heritage. However, upon the Department of Administrative Affairs gaining responsibility for the Arts after a departmental reshuffle (in "The Middle-Class Rip-Off"), Hacker asks Humphrey if he could tag along on a gala night at the Royal Opera House. Humphrey is delighted by the volte-face and declares, "Yes, Minister" enthusiastically. However, Hacker and his wife enjoy watching foreign films, and in the same episode, Hacker demonstrates some grasp of art, enough to make a strong case that a disputed art gallery in his constituency is not worth saving. (See also "Football" below.)
- Pomposity. Hacker is often seen going off into sentimental, overly pretentious speeches either to himself or to Bernard and Sir Humphrey, holding his lapel on his suit jacket in a very royal manner. He also mimicked Napoleon by slipping his hand in the front of his suit jacket upon hearing he was selected by the party to become party leader and hence prime minister. However, it appears that Hacker's political idol is Winston Churchill: he occasionally speaks in the statesman's gruff style, on several occasions imitating or paraphrasing Churchill's "We shall fight on the beaches" speech, and is seen reading biographies of him.
- Football. Hacker believes that sport is of great cultural importance and is even willing to sacrifice a local art gallery in order to bail out his constituency's football team, the fictional Aston Wanderers, that was being threatened with bankruptcy. He did not support the team though, and was mentioned as being an Aston Villa supporter in the first episode.

== Political affiliation ==
Hacker's political party is never explicitly stated; this is a deliberate ploy by the series' creators to prevent the show from having a partisan affiliation. This begins in the very first scene of the Yes Minister pilot episode, where the victorious Hacker's party rosette is white, as opposed to the red (for Labour) and blue (for the Conservatives) rosettes worn by the other candidates. The party that formed the previous government, which is now the opposition, is not explicitly identified either. In Yes Minister, the prime minister was unseen and unnamed, but established as male, whereas the real Prime Minister of the day was Margaret Thatcher. (The book adaptation by Lynn and Jay gives the prime minister a name — Herbert Attwell — but it is only mentioned once, and the character remains completely offscreen.) In "The Skeleton in the Cupboard", Hacker referred to "the other lot" being in power thirty years prior to the episode's events when discussing with Sir Humphrey a mistake which resulted in the relinquishing of forty million pounds' worth of military harbour installations, but does not specify which party (which in real-life would have been Conservatives during the 1950s).

The Labour and Conservative parties are eventually compared in "The National Education Service", when Sir Humphrey tells Bernard, "When there is a Labour government, the education authorities tell them that comprehensives abolish the class system and when there's a Tory government we tell them that it's the cheapest way of providing mass education; to Labour we explain that selective education is divisive and to the Tories we explain that it is expensive." but Sir Humphrey then goes on to tell Hacker neither of these things, forgoing any suggestion that Hacker is from either party.

In "Party Games", following the prime minister's surprise announcement of his retirement, Sir Humphrey and his predecessor Sir Arnold Robinson discuss who should succeed him. With the Home Secretary, previously the prime minister's likely successor, being forced to resign following a spectacular drink-driving incident (with Hacker speculating that the prime minister only served for as long as he did to prevent the Home Secretary from succeeding him), the chancellor of the Exchequer and the Foreign Secretary seemed to be the most likely successors. Humphrey relayed the concerns of the Chief Whip that as each candidate represented the extreme wings of their party, the election of either could antagonise the other's supporters and split the party. However, it is not mentioned what positions either candidate or wing support or oppose. With both candidates expressing desires to take proactive roles in governing and posing significant security risks, Hacker was positioned to succeed the prime minister unopposed as a moderate (otherwise described as a "compromise" or "less interventionist") candidate.

Throughout the show, Hacker's political opinions tend towards reform of administration and are neither left nor right wing. On first becoming a minister, Hacker intends to implement his party's manifesto commitment to "open government", but backs down when he is shown the dangers of the policy. He is known as "a good European", a believer in "the European ideal" embodied in the European Economic Community, but a critic of the bureaucracy in Brussels, such as EEC officials being tasked with encouraging farmers to create and destroy agricultural surpluses, the introduction of the compulsory Europass (albeit as a means of ending his ministerial career alongside the abolition of the Department of Administrative Affairs), and the standardisation of word processing equipment (albeit out of frustration after spending weeks negotiating a huge central order). In "Party Games", in his bid to become his party's new leader, and thus become prime minister, he engineers media and public outrage over the EEC's "Eurosausage" Plan involving the designation of British sausages as "emulsified high-fat offal tubes" due to insufficient meat content, despite being guaranteed an exemption for British sausages by the relevant EEC Commissioner; whilst admonishing the EEC in a Churchillian speech to party members, Hacker strikes a more amicable tone whilst being interviewed by Ludovic Kennedy. In "Big Brother", Hacker reaches out to Tom Sargent, his predecessor as Minister of Administrative Affairs in the previous government, now a member of the Opposition, for help to overcome Civil Service resistance to the introduction of safeguards for a National Integrated Database; after Sargent outlines the Civil Service's five step stalling technique and revealing the existence of a white paper to introduce safeguards, Hacker successfully forces Sir Humphrey's hand by publicly announcing future proposals for such safeguards and eventually presents the previously suppressed white paper drafted under Sargent.

Throughout the series, the party is mentioned as having constituencies in the West Midlands (such as Hacker's seat of Birmingham East), Merseyside, Glasgow, Nottingham and (oddly for a governing British political party) Northern Ireland. Most of these are described as marginal seats, often mentioned when a potentially unpopular decision is under consideration, such as the revitalisation of a nationalised chemical plant through the production of propanol using metadioxin (a chemical similar to dioxin, linked to the Seveso disaster and purported to cause foetal damage) or introducing ameliorative measures to deter smoking (to the detriment of tax revenue, jobs in the tobacco industry and patronage for culture and sports), as well as Hacker's efforts to raise the acquisition of British military hardware by Italian terrorists with the prime minister (to the potential detriment of the British arms industry). The party is also mentioned as controlling the South Derbyshire Council (criticised by Sir Humphrey for not submitting its records to Westminster but which turned out to be the most effective and efficient local authority in Britain) as well as contesting by-elections in Newcastle and Scotland.

== Other media ==
In a radio broadcast spoof of Yes Minister performed by both Eddington and Nigel Hawthorne, both of whom played their respective parts from the show, Hacker is a Minister in the government of the day, that of Margaret Thatcher, who also played herself as prime minister. In the sketch, she asks that Hacker and Sir Humphrey abolish economists.

In the 2010 stage production of Yes, Prime Minister, the role was played by David Haig; Graham Seed took the role in a touring production of the play. Set contemporaneously in the 2010s, Hacker is Prime Minister at the head of a coalition government.

In the 2013 revival series, Hacker is also played by David Haig.

== Notes ==
1. The timing of Hacker's early career is unclear. In "The Economy Drive", Annie tells Hacker, "For 20 years you've complained that as a backbencher you had no facilities." Annie may mean that he has been complaining for 20 years, not that he has been a backbencher for all that time. In "Open Government" it is said that he had been a shadow minister – not a backbencher – for "many years"; the book adaptation specifically says seven years. Hacker is in his late forties (Open Government) and graduated from LSE 25 years earlier (The Official Visit), so he must have been elected five years after graduation, aged in his late 20s. This suggests Hacker must have had his various other careers, such as editing Reform, at the same time as being an MP, or that he left parliament and later returned. In the Yes, Prime Minister episode A Real Partnership, Annie says, "You were a backbench MP only five years ago." In the previous episode, Dorothy Wainwright, adviser to Hacker and to the previous Prime Minister, says she has been working at No. 10 Downing Street for three years, so Hacker's party won the general election at least three years earlier. If Annie's statement is correct, this would mean Hacker was in the Shadow Cabinet for two years rather than seven.

2.Hacker's obituary says that he was a minister for two years. In the Yes, Prime Minister episode The Key, Dorothy has been at No. 10 for three years. As a political adviser, she cannot have been there before Hacker's party won the election. However, how much time has passed between Party Games and The Key is not specified. In the later episode Official Secrets, Hacker refers to events during his time as a cabinet minister as having taken place five years earlier. Assuming that the Parliament Act 1911 applies in the world of the show, there is a maximum of five years between general elections, so either Hacker has won an election between episodes, or an election is imminent. The obituary implies the latter, stating that Hacker fought and lost a general election after only a short time as Prime Minister.

3.This implies that the first episode, Open Government, in which Hacker is said to be in his late 40s, takes place no later than 1976, whereas the first book adaptation says it is in 'the 1980s'.
