= List of Yes Minister and Yes, Prime Minister episodes =

Thirty-eight episodes of Yes Minister and Yes, Prime Minister were made in total, running from 1980 to 1988. A one-hour special aired in 1984; all other episodes were a half-hour in length. The dates listed below are when a particular episode was first transmitted on BBC2.

== Series overview ==
=== Yes Minister ===
Series	Episodes	Originally released	
Series	Episodes	First released	Last released
1	7	25 February 1980	7 April 1980
2	7	23 February 1981	6 April 1981
3	7	11 November 1982	23 December 1982
Christmas Sketch		27 December 1982	
Christmas Special		17 December 1984	

=== Yes, Prime Minister ===
Series	Episodes	Originally released	
Series	Episodes	First released	Last released
1	8	9 January 1986	27 February 1986
2	8	3 December 1987	28 January 1988

== Yes Minister (1980–1984) ==
=== Series 1 (1980) ===
No. overall	No. in series	Title	Original release date
1	1	"Open Government"	25 February 1980
The new Minister's idealistic commitment to open the windows of his department faces its first hurdle: Sir Humphrey and the Civil Service.
2	2	"The Official Visit"	3 March 1980
Jim Hacker welcomes the visit of the new President of Buranda, an old university chum who has his own agenda.
3	3	"The Economy Drive"	10 March 1980
Hacker plans to slim down the civil service – but Sir Humphrey forces him to set a personal example.
4	4	"Big Brother"	17 March 1980
Sir Humphrey drags his feet over the safeguards for a new National Integrated Database.
5	5	"The Writing on the Wall"	24 March 1980
The threat of the abolition of the Department of Administrative Affairs forces Hacker and Sir Humphrey to work together.
6	6	"The Right to Know"	31 March 1980
A threatened badger colony demonstrates that Sir Humphrey must be selective in what he tells his Minister, especially when Lucy Hacker - Jim Hacker's daughter - gets involved.
7	7	"Jobs for the Boys"	7 April 1980
Hacker is kept in the dark over a doomed building project, and discovers that it takes two to quango.

=== Series 2 (1981) ===
No. overall	No. in series	Title	Original release date
8	1	"The Compassionate Society"	23 February 1981
Hacker is concerned about a brand new, fully staffed hospital that has no patients. He learns, however, just how powerful the unions are. Featuring Norman Bird.
9	2	"Doing the Honours"	2 March 1981
Hacker plans to withhold honours for civil servants who do not reduce their budgets.
10	3	"The Death List"	9 March 1981
The Minister is forced to re-appraise his views on bugging and phone tapping after a death threat. Featuring Graeme Garden.
11	4	"The Greasy Pole"	16 March 1981
Plans for a new chemical factory hinge on the outcome of a so-called "independent" report. Featuring Brenda Blethyn.
12	5	"The Devil You Know"	23 March 1981
A Cabinet reshuffle coincides with a vacancy in Brussels. Hacker wonders who the PM has in mind to fill it.
13	6	"The Quality of Life"	30 March 1981
Hacker vows to keep open a city farm that Sir Humphrey has enabled to be bulldozed to make way for a car park for Inland Revenue inspectors.
14	7	"A Question of Loyalty"	6 April 1981
Hacker and Sir Humphrey are tested by a select committee on their commitment to reducing waste in government expenditure. Featuring Judy Parfitt.

=== Series 3 (1982) ===
No. overall	No. in series	Title	Original release date
15	1	"Equal Opportunities"	11 November 1982
Sir Humphrey does not see eye to eye with the Minister's plan for gender equality in the civil service. Featuring Eleanor Bron.
16	2	"The Challenge"	18 November 1982
Fallout shelters upset Hacker's crusade to make local authorities responsible for their expenditure. Featuring Ludovic Kennedy
17	3	"The Skeleton in the Cupboard"	25 November 1982
Details of a 1950s defence contract are about to be made public – and Sir Humphrey seems unaccountably nervous. Featuring Ian Lavender.
18	4	"The Moral Dimension"	2 December 1982
After signing a huge export order in Kumran, Hacker is upset to discover it was obtained through bribery.
19	5	"The Bed of Nails"	9 December 1982
Hacker is made Transport Supremo – and soon wonders if it is a title worth having.
20	6	"The Whisky Priest"	16 December 1982
Hacker faces a moral dilemma when he learns that British bombs are ending up in the hands of Italian terrorists.
21	7	"The Middle-Class Rip-Off"	23 December 1982
Sir Humphrey is incensed that Hacker plans to subsidise his local football club by selling a local museum.

=== Christmas Sketch (1982) ===
A two-minute Christmas-themed sketch, featuring only Eddington, Hawthorne and Fowlds, was aired on BBC1 as part of a 1982 Christmas special titled The Funny Side of Christmas.

Title	Original release date
"Christmas at the Ministry"	27 December 1982
Sir Humphrey has a special end-of-year message for the Minister, delivered in, even by his standards, an especially circumlocutory style. His message was later transcribed and printed in The Utterly Utterly Merry Comic Relief Christmas Book.

=== Christmas Special (1984) ===
No. overall	Title	Original release date
22	"Party Games"	17 December 1984
The unexpected resignation of the PM prompts a race for the succession, and, as Party Chairman, Hacker is in a key position—and the Civil Service, now headed by Sir Humphrey, has its own agenda. (Special hour-long episode.)

== Yes, Prime Minister (1986–1988) ==
=== Series 1 (1986) ===
No. overall	No. in series	Title	Original release date
1	1	"The Grand Design"	9 January 1986
With his finger now on the nuclear button, Hacker plans his first act as Prime Minister to be a radical new defence policy.
2	2	"The Ministerial Broadcast"	16 January 1986
Hacker is groomed for his first television broadcast as PM, but Sir Humphrey is more concerned with the content.
3	3	"The Smoke Screen"	23 January 1986
Hacker uses his Health Minister's plan to eliminate smoking as a bluff against the Treasury.
4	4	"The Key"	30 January 1986
The PM decides to clip Sir Humphrey's wings when he engages in a territorial battle with Hacker's political advisor.
5	5	"A Real Partnership"	6 February 1986
Sir Humphrey has to get through a civil service pay claim while at the same time discrediting its proposer.
6	6	"A Victory for Democracy"	13 February 1986
Hacker has difficulty discovering if the Foreign Office is there to carry out government policy or vice versa.
7	7	"The Bishop's Gambit"	20 February 1986
A troubled British nurse in Kumran and a vacant bishopric combine to provide an opportunity for Sir Humphrey.
8	8	"One of Us"	27 February 1986
The former head of MI5 is revealed to be a spy (despite Sir Humphrey clearing him), while a dog strays onto Salisbury Plain. Featuring Michael Aldridge.

=== Series 2 (1987–88) ===
No. overall	No. in series	Title	Original release date
9	1	"Man Overboard"	3 December 1987
Sir Humphrey fights the Employment Secretary's plan to relocate service personnel to the North of England by casting doubt over the Minister's loyalty.
10	2	"Official Secrets"	10 December 1987
Hacker attempts to suppress an unflattering chapter of his predecessor's memoirs that has been leaked to the press.
11	3	"A Diplomatic Incident"	17 December 1987
The death of Hacker's predecessor provides a chance for some negotiations with France over the Channel Tunnel at his state funeral.
12	4	"A Conflict of Interest"	23 December 1987
Hacker can avoid a City scandal if he appoints a Bank of England Governor whose honesty is not beyond reproach.
13	5	"Power to the People"	7 January 1988
Sir Humphrey and the leader of Houndsworth Council become strange bedfellows when Hacker tries to reform local government. This episode gave rise to the Politician's syllogism.
14	6	"The Patron of the Arts"	14 January 1988
Hacker's invitation to the British Theatre Awards dinner becomes a hot potato when the size of the Arts Council grant is revealed. Features John Bird.
15	7	"The National Education Service"	21 January 1988
When the Department of Education and Science stands in the way of reform, Hacker decides to abolish it.
16	8	"The Tangled Web"	28 January 1988
When Hacker unwittingly lies to the House of Commons he is helped by Sir Humphrey's unfortunate indiscretion.

== Yes, Prime Minister (2013) ==
In January 2013, a new series of Yes, Prime Minister was launched on the Gold television channel.
