= Yes Minister =

British political satire sitcom (1980–1988)

- Title card
- Also known as: Yes, Prime Minister
- Genre: Political satire British sitcom
- Written by: Antony Jay; Jonathan Lynn
- Starring: Paul Eddington; Nigel Hawthorne; Derek Fowlds
- Theme music composer: Ronnie Hazlehurst
- Country of origin: United Kingdom
- Original language: English
- No. of series: 3 (Yes Minister); 2 (Yes, Prime Minister)
- No. of episodes: Yes Minister: 21 + 2 specials Yes, Prime Minister: 16 (list of episodes)

Production
- Producers: Stuart Allen; Sydney Lotterby; Peter Whitmore
- Camera setup: Multi-camera
- Running time: 30 minutes (with a one-hour-long Christmas episode and a short special)

Original release
- Network: BBC2
- Release: 25 February 1980 – 28 January 1988

Related
- Yes, Prime Minister (2013 TV series)

Yes Minister is a British political satire sitcom written by Antony Jay and Jonathan Lynn. It comprises three series of seven episodes each, first transmitted on BBC2 from 1980 to 1984. A sequel, Yes, Prime Minister, ran for 16 episodes from 1986 to 1988. All but one of the episodes lasted half an hour, and almost all ended with a variation of the title of the series spoken as the answer to a question posed by Minister (later, Prime Minister) Jim Hacker. Several episodes were adapted for BBC Radio; the series also spawned a 2010 stage play that led to a new television series on Gold in 2013.

Set principally in the private office of a British cabinet minister in the fictional Department of Administrative Affairs in Whitehall, Yes Minister follows the ministerial career of Jim Hacker, played by Paul Eddington. His various struggles to formulate and enact policy or effect departmental changes are opposed by the British Civil Service, in particular his Permanent Secretary, Sir Humphrey Appleby, played by Nigel Hawthorne. His Principal Private Secretary Bernard Woolley, played by Derek Fowlds, is usually caught between the two. The sequel, Yes, Prime Minister, continued with the same cast and followed Hacker after his unexpected elevation to prime ministerial office.

There were 21 half-hour episodes in three series, a two-minute Christmas sketch in The Funny Side of Christmas, and a one-hour Christmas special of Yes Minister. There were 16 episodes in two series of Yes, Prime Minister, bringing the combined number of full episodes to 38.

The series received several BAFTAs, and in 2004, was voted sixth in the Britain's Best Sitcom poll. It was the favourite television programme of Margaret Thatcher, the then-British prime minister. The series was also a big hit on Public Broadcasting System (PBS) stations throughout the United States.

== Plot ==
The series opens in the wake of a general election in which the incumbent government has been defeated by the opposition party, to which Jim Hacker, an MP, belongs. His party affiliation is never stated, his party emblem is clearly neither Conservative nor Labour, and his party's political colour is white. The prime minister offers Hacker the position of minister of administrative affairs, which he accepts. Hacker goes to his department and meets his permanent secretary, Sir Humphrey Appleby, and principal private secretary, Bernard Woolley.

While Appleby is outwardly deferential towards the new minister, he is prepared to defend the status quo at all costs. Hacker and his party's policies of reducing bureaucracy are diametrically opposed to the Civil Service's interests, in which staff numbers and budgets are viewed as merits of success (i.e. the more funding or staffing a department gets, the more successful it is considered). Woolley is sympathetic towards Hacker but as Appleby reminds him, Woolley's civil service superiors, including Appleby, will have much to say about the course of his future career, while ministers do not usually stay long in one department and have no say in civil service staffing recommendations.

Many of the episodes revolve around proposals backed by Hacker but frustrated by Appleby, who uses a range of clever stratagems to defeat ministerial proposals while seeming to support them. Other episodes revolve around proposals promoted by Appleby but rejected by Hacker, which Appleby attempts by all means necessary to persuade Hacker to accept. They do occasionally join forces in order to achieve a common goal, such as preventing the closure of their department or dealing with a diplomatic incident.

As the series revolves around the inner workings of central government, most of the scenes take place in private locations, such as offices and exclusive members' clubs. Lynn said that "there was not a single scene set in the House of Commons because government does not take place in the House of Commons. Some politics and much theatre takes place there. Government happens in private. As in all public performances, the real work is done in rehearsal, behind closed doors. Then the public and the House are shown what the government wishes them to see." However, the episode "The Compassionate Society" does feature an audio recording of Yesterday in Parliament in which Hacker speaks in the House of Commons, and other episodes include scenes in the foreign secretary's House of Commons office ("The Writing on the Wall") and a Committee room ("A Question of Loyalty").

The fictional Department of Administrative Affairs is the main setting of the first series. In "The Skeleton in the Cupboard", Woolley mentions that the DAA was founded in 1964 alongside the Department of Economic Affairs (the chief inspiration for the DAA). In "Open Government", the department was referred to as a 'political graveyard', with Hacker's appointment as Minister of Administrative Affairs likely being punishment for managing the leadership campaign against the new Prime Minister when their party was in Opposition. In "Big Brother", Hacker reaches out to his predecessor in the previous government Tom Sargent, for help to overcome Civil Service resistance to the introduction of safeguards for the National Integrated Database, to which Sargent outlines the Civil Service's five step stalling technique and reveals the existence of a White Paper. Being responsible for overseeing the administration of other government departments, government archives, the purchase of office equipment and the enactment of EEC directives, it serves as a vehicle to explore different political themes, such as foreign policy, education, the environment, health, defence, Europe, international trade, local government, infrastructure, and national security. In "The Death List", the DAA is mentioned as being responsible for the government's surveillance equipment. The DAA has gained other responsibilities through departmental reshuffles, namely the arts (albeit as a ploy to prevent Hacker from closing down an art gallery in his constituency to save a local football team from bankruptcy). The DAA has also been given responsibility for enacting policies or programmes which no other department would want to deal with due to their unpopularity or any other fallout, such as in "The Bed of Nails" when Hacker was made Transport Supremo and given responsibility for an Integrated Transport programme as the Department of Transport did not want to incur the wrath of any disadvantaged sector.

== Characters ==
Character	Yes Minister																						Yes, Prime Minister															
Character	Series 1							Series 2							Series 3							Special	Series 1								Series 2							
Character	1	2	3	4	5	6	7	1	2	3	4	5	6	7	1	2	3	4	5	6	7	Special	1	2	3	4	5	6	7	8	1	2	3	4	5	6	7	8
Jim Hacker																																						
Sir Humphrey Appleby																																						
Bernard Woolley																																						
Annie Hacker																																						
															Civil Servants																							
Sir Arnold Robinson																																						
Sir Frederick Stewart																																						
Sir Ian Whitchurch																																						
Sir Frank Gordon																																						
Sir Richard Wharton																																						
Bill Pritchard																																						
Malcolm Warren																																						
Dr Richard Cartwright																																						
															Political Advisors																							
Frank Weisel																																						
Dorothy Wainwright																																						
Sir Mark Spencer																																						
															Others																							
Sir Desmond Glazebrook																																						
Field Marshal Sir Guy Howard																																						
Vic Gould, Chief Whip																																						
Robert Dougall																																						
Ludovic Kennedy																																						
George, the driver																																						
Character	1	2	3	4	5	6	7	1	2	3	4	5	6	7	1	2	3	4	5	6	7	Special	1	2	3	4	5	6	7	8	1	2	3	4	5	6	7	8
Character	Series 1							Series 2							Series 3							Special	Series 1								Series 2							
Character	Yes Minister																						Yes, Prime Minister															

=== Jim Hacker ===
The three main characters in the Minister's Office of the Department of Administrative Affairs: from left, Sir Humphrey Appleby, Bernard Woolley and Jim Hacker

The Right Honourable Jim Hacker MP (Paul Eddington), eventually elevated to the House of Lords as Lord Hacker of Islington, was the editor of a newspaper called Reform before going into politics. He spent a good deal of time in Parliament on the Opposition benches before his party won a general election, including serving as the Shadow Secretary for Agriculture. In Yes Minister, he is the minister for administrative affairs (a fictitious ministry of the British government) and a cabinet minister, and in Yes, Prime Minister he becomes the prime minister of the United Kingdom. Hacker received his degree from the London School of Economics (graduating with a Third), for which he is often derided by the Oxford-educated Sir Humphrey (who attended "Baillie College", a thinly veiled reference to the real Balliol College, graduating with a First in Classics). His early character is that of a gung-ho, but naïve, politician, bringing sweeping changes to his department. Before long, Hacker begins to notice that Civil Service tactics are preventing his planned changes being put into practice. As he learns, he becomes more sly and cynical, using some of the Civil Service ruses himself. While Sir Humphrey initially held all the aces, Hacker now and again plays a trump card of his own and thus scores the occasional victory over Sir Humphrey.

Throughout Yes Minister, Hacker, at his worst, is portrayed as a publicity-seeking bungler who is incapable of making a firm decision. He is prone to potentially embarrassing blunders, and is a frequent target of criticism from the press and stern lectures from the Chief Whip. However, he is also shown to be relatively politically savvy, and he slowly becomes more aware of Sir Humphrey's real agenda. In Yes, Prime Minister, Hacker becomes more statesmanlike. He practises more grandiose speeches, dreams up his "Grand Design" and hones his diplomatic skills. Nearly all of these efforts land him in trouble. In a Radio Times interview to promote Yes, Prime Minister, Paul Eddington stated, "He's beginning to find his feet as a man of power, and he's begun to confound those who thought they'd be able to manipulate him out of hand."

=== Sir Humphrey Appleby ===
Sir Humphrey Appleby (Nigel Hawthorne) serves throughout the series as permanent secretary under his minister, Jim Hacker at the Department of Administrative Affairs. He is appointed Cabinet secretary just as Hacker's party enters a leadership crisis, and is instrumental in Hacker's elevation to prime minister. He is committed to maintaining the status quo for the country in general and for the Civil Service in particular. Sir Humphrey is a master of obfuscation and manipulation, baffling his opponents with long-winded technical jargon and circumlocutions, strategically appointing allies to supposedly impartial boards, and setting up interdepartmental committees to smother his minister's proposals in red tape.

"Sir Humphrey's big speeches"
An example of Hawthorne's performance of the "big speeches", from the episode "Man Overboard"

However, although presenting an outward appearance of supreme confidence and competence, Sir Humphrey is not immune to making miscalculations or outright blunders. When such blunders occur, he relies on the Civil Service bureaucracy to save him.

In Britain's Best Sitcom, Stephen Fry comments that "we love the idea of the coherence and articulacy of Sir Humphrey ... it's one of the things you look forward to in an episode of Yes Minister ... when's the big speech going to happen? And can I see if he's reading it from an idiot board ... he's really learned it, and it's superb." Derek Fowlds posited to a concerned Eddington that these speeches were the reason why Hawthorne won a BAFTA for Best Comedy Performance four times in a row, while Eddington, though nominated, did not win at all.

Sir Humphrey frequently employs his command of the English language and his knowledge of Latin and Greek grammar to bewilder his political master and obscure the issues under discussion. In a Radio Times interview to promote the second series of Yes, Prime Minister, producer Sydney Lotterby said that he always tried to give Eddington and Hawthorne extra time to rehearse as their scenes invariably featured lengthy dialogue exchanges.

=== Bernard Woolley ===
Bernard Woolley, MA (Oxon) (Derek Fowlds) is Jim Hacker's Principal Private Secretary. His loyalties are often split between his Minister and his Civil Service boss, Sir Humphrey. Whilst in theory he is personally responsible to Hacker, in practice it is Sir Humphrey who writes his performance reviews and influences his Civil Service career. He usually handles these situations well, and maintains his reputation in the Civil Service as a "high flier" as opposed to a "low flier supported by occasional gusts of wind."

Woolley is always quick to point out the physical impossibilities of Sir Humphrey's or Hacker's mixed metaphors, with almost obsessive pedantry. He can occasionally appear rather childlike, by making animal noises and gestures or by acting out how such an analogy cannot work, which sometimes annoys his Minister. Woolley tends to side with Hacker when new policies are announced, because they seem radical or democratic, only for Sir Humphrey to point out the disadvantages to the status quo and the civil service in particular. To sway Bernard, Sir Humphrey uses phrases such as "barbarism" and "the beginning of the end". At times when Sir Humphrey fails to get his way, Woolley can be seen smiling smugly at him over his defeat. As Hacker awaits confirmation of his elevation to Prime Minister, he asks Woolley to join him in Downing Street as his principal private secretary, which Sir Humphrey endorses, thus keeping the trio together.

In a 2004 retrospective, Armando Iannucci commented that Fowlds had a difficult task because he had to "spend most of his time saying nothing but looking interested in everyone else's total and utter guff" but "his one line frequently had to be the funniest of the lot." Iannucci suggests that Woolley is essential to the structure of the show because both Hacker and Appleby confide in him, "which means we get to find out what they're plotting next."

The editor's note to The Complete Yes Prime Minister (supposedly published in 2024 after Hacker's death but actually published by the BBC in 1989), thanks "Sir Bernard Woolley, GCB" for his help and confirms that he did indeed make it to the position of Head of the Civil Service.

=== Other recurring characters ===
The series featured a cast of recurring characters.

- Frank Weisel (often deprecatingly pronounced weasel) — played by Neil Fitzwiliam in the television series, whereas he is voiced by Bill Nighy in the radio series adaptations — is Hacker's crusading, idealistic political advisor in the first series. The less scrupulous Hacker finds him rather tiresome after a time, while Sir Humphrey finds him positively loathsome from the outset. In the final scene of the last episode of the first series, Weisel is sent on a deliberately lengthy worldwide fact-finding assignment to learn about quangos to ensure a set of politically face-saving quango appointments and to prevent his publication of a quango reform white paper. He does not appear in and is not mentioned in any later series.
- Dorothy Wainwright, special advisor to the prime minister, played by Deborah Norton. Wainwright is rather more down-to-earth than Weisel, and rarely takes the bait when provoked. Also unlike Weisel, she knows Sir Humphrey's tricks and is able to give the Prime Minister instant and practical advice how to get past his manipulations. Sir Humphrey is aware of this and sees her as a genuine rival rather than a mere irritant. He usually condescendingly addresses her as "Dear Lady", rather than using her name. Earlier Prime Ministerial advisors had appeared from time to time in episodes of Yes Minister, including Daniel Moynihan as Daniel Hughes in "The Writing on the Wall" (1980) and Nigel Stock as Sir Mark Spencer in "Bed of Nails" (1982). In the later stage play and 2013 television revival, Hacker's young advisor, Claire Sutton, had a larger role than any of her predecessors.
- Hacker also has a Press Secretary, Bill Pritchard, played by Antony Carrick. Pritchard is seen in a total of five widely spaced episodes, spanning the run of both series. A second Press Secretary, Malcolm Warren (played by Barry Stanton), appears in two episodes of the first series of Yes Prime Minister.

Meanwhile, Sir Humphrey's Civil Service colleagues were also regularly featured. They include:

- Sir Arnold Robinson (played by John Nettleton), Cabinet Secretary in Yes Minister and later (after his retirement from the civil service) President of the Campaign for Freedom of Information in Yes, Prime Minister. The reserved, dignified Sir Arnold is a master manipulator, to whom Sir Humphrey often turns for counsel, even after he retires and has no reason to frequent Whitehall any more. In many ways, Sir Arnold acts as a mentor to Sir Humphrey, especially as the two men are evidently of the same social class and share many of the same political views and support the idea that it is really the Civil Service running the government, rather than the ministers themselves. Like Sir Humphrey, he is also seen wearing the tie of Balliol College, Oxford. He is generally able to be seen as everything one can read into Sir Humphrey himself, but taken to even further extremes.
- Sir Frederick Stewart (played by John Savident in the television series, whereas he is voiced by Peter Cellier in the radio series adaptations), Permanent Secretary of the Foreign and Commonwealth Office, known as "Jumbo" to his friends. A friendly confidant of Sir Humphrey, but seen only during the first series.
- Sir Ian Whitchurch (played by John Barron), Permanent Secretary to the Department of Health and Social Security. He is similarly detached from the realities of the world as most other high ranking civil servants in the series, evidenced by his acceptance that "it's possible" that a newly built hospital will cater to patients eventually - "certainly our present intention".
- Sir Richard Wharton (played by Donald Pickering), a later Permanent Secretary to the Foreign and Commonwealth Office. It is not known whether or not he replaced Jumbo directly. Unlike many of Sir Humphrey's peers, Sir Richard is generally portrayed as both competent and realistic in his approach.
- Sir Frank Gordon, who appears in both Yes Minister and Yes, Prime Minister as Permanent Secretary to the Treasury (played by Peter Cellier). Due to his position, he is occasionally recognised by Sir Humphrey as a genuine threat to his own career ambitions, Sir Frank is a smooth, confident, well-mannered manipulator out for his own ends.
- Sir Humphrey also has an old acquaintance, Sir Desmond Glazebrook (played by Richard Vernon), who is Board member, then chairman, of Bartlett's Bank. Glazebrook is an amiably vague fellow of impeccable respectability, very little actual financial knowledge, and no fixed opinions on anything. Hacker appointed him Governor of the Bank of England in the Yes, Prime Minister episode "A Conflict of Interest", in order to avoid a financial collapse of the City.

Hacker's family:

- His wife, Annie Hacker (played by Diana Hoddinott), who appears in multiple episodes on both series.
- His daughter, Lucy (played by Gerry Cowper), who only appears on-screen in one episode ("The Right to Know") as an environmental campaigner, but who is mentioned intermittently throughout. By the time of Yes, Prime Minister, she is a student at the University of Sussex (which Hacker likens to a kibbutz).
- In "Party Games", Hacker implies that he and Annie have more than one child, though there is no mention of this anywhere else.

Others:

- Lady Appleby, Sir Humphrey's wife, is mentioned on occasion, seen only briefly from behind (in an uncredited, non-speaking appearance) in "Big Brother", and never given a first name.
- Various Chief Whips, usually acting in Yes Minister as a "gatekeeper" to the unseen prime minister. The first Chief Whip, Vic Gould, was played by Edward Jewesbury in two episodes of Yes Minister. Gould was initially intended to be a more prominent character in the series, as the writers thought he would continually force Hacker to pursue policies unappealing to Sir Humphrey, and thus lead to greater conflict. They quickly found that Gould's character was largely unnecessary, and that the Hacker/Sir Humphrey conflicts worked just as well without him. In "Party Games", a later Chief Whip, played by James Grout and identified as "Jeffrey", conspires with Sir Humphrey to ensure that Hacker becomes prime minister. In two episodes of Yes, Prime Minister, Jeffrey is now played by Peter Cartwright. (In the novelizations, the character is given the full name of Jeffrey Pearson.) Jeffrey is clueless about an alleged Cabinet plot against the prime minister ... because there is none, and Hacker is pursuing a false trail laid by Sir Humphrey.
- Hacker's chauffeur, George (Arthur Cox), appeared in five episodes. He is a character who is always more in touch with current events than is the minister – anything from empty NHS hospitals to Cabinet reshuffles. This often irritates Hacker who, when he asks George where the information came from, is usually told that it is common knowledge among the Whitehall drivers.
- Tom Sargent (Robert Urquhart), Hacker's predecessor as Minister for Administrative Affairs in the previous government, made one appearance in the episode "Big Brother". He told Hacker about the Civil Service's five-step stalling technique and a white paper drafted for the introduction of safeguards for an integrated government database.
- Dr. Richard Cartwright (played by Ian Lavender) is a civil service under-secretary in the Department for Administrative Affairs who shows a great expertise in the affairs of local government, and shares that expertise with Hacker—much to Sir Humphrey's displeasure. Hacker seeks out Cartwright's advice directly in "The Challenge" and "The Skeleton in the Cupboard", with such potentially disastrous consequences (at least for Sir Humphrey) that Sir Humphrey hints at Cartwright's being moved to another job as a result.
- Eileen (Miranda Forbes) is a secretary in Sir Humphrey's office, usually seen ushering guests in. She is seen in four episodes of Yes, Prime Minister.
- Well-known broadcasters who played themselves included Robert McKenzie, Ludovic Kennedy and Sue Lawley. Robert Dougall regularly played a newsreader, which was his own real-life profession. Among other newscasters, Nicholas Witchell can be heard reporting on Hacker's visit to a school in "The National Education Service" and Sophie Raworth is seen on television in the 2013 revival.

== Production ==
=== Politics ===
Lynn joined the Cambridge Union in his first year at the University of Cambridge because he thought that he might like to enter politics. "All of the main debaters there, aged 20, were the most pompous, self-satisfied, self-important bunch of clowns that I've ever clapped eyes on. They were all behaving as if they were on the government front bench, and 20 years later they all were: Michael Howard; John Selwyn Gummer; Kenneth Clarke. I thought at that point that the only way that I could ever contribute to politics is making fun of the politicians."

The series was conceived as a satire of politics and government in general, rather than of any specific party. The writers placed Hacker at the centre of the political spectrum, and were careful to identify his party headquarters as "Central House" (a combination of Conservative Central Office and Labour's Transport House). The terms "Labour" and "Conservative" are scrupulously avoided throughout the series, favouring terms such as "the party" or "the government" and "the opposition". In the first scene of the first episode, "Open Government", Hacker is shown at the declaration of his constituency result wearing a white rosette, with other candidates sporting the red and blue rosettes associated with the two leading British parties. The one exception to this neutrality occurs very briefly in "The National Education Service", when Sir Humphrey explains to Bernard how the policy of comprehensive education is retained through successive governments, using different arguments according to which party is in power. Even there, Humphrey does not reveal which party Jim Hacker represents. Despite this, the overall thrust was towards government reduction rather than expansion. The episode "Jobs for the Boys", for example, rejected corporatism. Throughout the period of Yes Minister and Yes Prime Minister the incumbent government of the United Kingdom was Conservative with the government led by Margaret Thatcher (although the pilot was produced before she came to power). Hacker's predecessor as Prime Minister was unseen and unnamed, but established as male.

In a 2004 documentary, Armando Iannucci compared Yes Minister to George Orwell's Nineteen Eighty-Four in how it has influenced the public's view of the state. Although Lynn comments that the word "spin" has "probably entered the political vocabulary since the series," Iannucci suggests that the show "taught us how to unpick the verbal tricks that politicians think they can get away with in front of the cameras." The series depicted the media-consciousness of politicians, reflecting the public relations training they undergo to help them deal with interviews and reading from autocue effectively. This is particularly evident in the episode "The Ministerial Broadcast", in which Hacker is advised on the effects of his clothes and surroundings. The episode "A Conflict of Interest" humorously lampoons the various political stances of Britain's newspapers through their readers (although this material was not original):

Sir Humphrey: The only way to understand the Press is to remember that they pander to their readers' prejudices.

Hacker: Don't tell me about the press. I know exactly who reads the papers: the Daily Mirror is read by people who think they run the country; The Guardian is read by people who think they ought to run the country; The Times is read by the people who actually do run the country; the Daily Mail is read by the wives of the people who run the country; the Financial Times is read by people who own the country; the Morning Star is read by people who think the country ought to be run by another country; and The Daily Telegraph is read by people who think it is.

Sir Humphrey: Prime Minister, what about the people who read The Sun?

Bernard: Sun readers don't care who runs the country, as long as she's got big tits.

Adam Curtis, in his three-part TV documentary The Trap, criticised the series as "ideological propaganda for a political movement", and claimed that Yes Minister is indicative of a larger movement of criticism of government and bureaucracy, centred upon public choice economics. Jay himself supported this:

The fallacy that public choice economics took on was the fallacy that government is working entirely for the benefit of the citizen; and this was reflected by showing that in any [episode] in the programme, in Yes Minister, we showed that almost everything that the government has to decide is a conflict between two lots of private interest – that of the politicians and that of the civil servants trying to advance their own careers and improve their own lives. And that's why public choice economics, which explains why all this was going on, was at the root of almost every episode of Yes Minister and Yes, Prime Minister.

Jay, however, has elsewhere emphasized that he and Lynn were interested first and foremost in the comical possibilities present in government and bureaucracy and that they were not seeking to promote any agenda: "Our only firm belief on the subject was that the underlying conflicts between ministers and ministries were better brought out into the open than kept secret".

=== Inspirations ===
The writers were inspired by a variety of sources, including sources inside government, published material and contemporary news stories. Jay has written that as early as 1965, he had been induced by developments in the Timothy Evans case to wonder about an "inverted alchemy" operating in Whitehall, capable of frustrating the most impassioned campaigner. The writers also met several leading senior civil servants under the auspices of the Royal Institute of Public Administration, a think-tank for the public service sector, which led to the development of some plot lines. Some situations were conceived as fiction, but were later revealed to have real-life counterparts. The episode "The Compassionate Society" depicts a hospital with 500 administrative staff but no doctors, nurses or patients. Lynn recalls that "after inventing this absurdity, we discovered there were six such hospitals (or very large empty wings of hospitals) exactly as we had described them in our episode."

In a programme screened by the BBC in early 2004, paying tribute to the series, it was revealed that Jay and Lynn had drawn on information provided by two insiders from the governments of Harold Wilson and James Callaghan, namely Marcia Falkender and Bernard Donoughue. The published diaries of Richard Crossman also provided inspiration. In particular the first of these describe his battles with "the Dame", his Permanent Secretary, the formidable Baroness Sharp, the first woman in Britain to hold the position.

The episode entitled "The Moral Dimension", in which Hacker and his staff engage in the scheme of secretly consuming alcohol on a trade mission to the fictional Islamic state of Qumran, was based on a real incident that took place in Pakistan, involving Callaghan and Donoughue, the latter of whom informed Jay and Lynn about the incident. Jay says that "I can't tell you where, I can't tell you when and I can't tell you who was involved; all I can tell you is that we knew that it had actually happened. That's why it was so funny. We couldn't think up things as funny as the real things that had happened." Media historian Andrew Crisell suggests that the show was "enriched by the viewers' suspicion that what they were watching was unhealthily close to real life."

Fusing inspiration and invention, Lynn and Jay worked on the story "for anything from three days to two weeks," and only took "four mornings to write all the dialogue. After we wrote the episode, we would show it to some secret sources, always including somebody who was an expert on the subject in question. They would usually give us extra information which, because it was true, was usually funnier than anything we might have thought up." Designers Valerie Warrender and Gloria Clayton were given access to the Cabinet Rooms and the State Drawing Rooms. For security purposes, the arrangements of the rooms were altered, and the views from the windows were never shown, to conceal the layout of the buildings. Lynn said in a 2007 interview that he and Jay had two main sources who worked at Number 10, who introduced them to others, and that they used lunches with their sources to get information. "Everyone in Government has an axe to grind, everyone wants their point of view expressed in the media, and the higher up they get the more indiscreet they become...They all leak like sieves, as long as they know they won't be identified."

=== Opening titles and music ===
Gerald Scarfe's caricature of Paul Eddington as Hacker

The opening titles were drawn by artist and cartoonist Gerald Scarfe, who provided distinctive caricatures of Eddington, Hawthorne and Fowlds in their respective roles to represent distortion. He animated them as 'self-drawing' by positioning the camera above his paper, adding parts of lines, and then photographing two frames at a time. The sequence ended with the title of the episode superimposed on a facsimile of an edition of the House of Commons Weekly Information Bulletin (retaining the bulletin's legend "Compiled in the Public Information Office of the House of Commons Library"). Scarfe created a second set of graphics for Yes, Prime Minister, including a different title card for each episode. Derek Fowlds wanted to buy an original drawing but was unable to afford it. The series' performance credits typically only featured those of the actors who appeared in the particular episode, not the names of characters. The typeface used in the credits is Plantin, a common typeface used in the British press at the time. The show title is set in bold condensed and the credits are in bold.

The theme music was composed by Ronnie Hazlehurst and is largely based on the Westminster Quarters: the chimes of Big Ben. When asked in an interview about its Westminster influence, Hazlehurst replied, "That's all it is. It's the easiest thing I've ever done." The theme has a strong similarity to that of To The Manor Born, which was also composed by Hazlehurst around the same time.

A substantially different set of titles and music were produced for the pilot episode, "Open Government", which were never broadcast but appear on the DVD release. The pilot opening and closing title caption cards feature drawings of most of the cast, but far less exaggerated than those of Scarfe, while the music by Max Harris is a more up-tempo piece for brass band. When the pilot was aired as part of series 1, these were replaced by the familiar Scarfe and Hazlehurst credits.

=== Writing ===
The different ideals and self-interested motives of the characters are frequently contrasted. Whilst Hacker occasionally approaches an issue from a sense of idealism and a desire to be seen to improve things, he ultimately sees his re-election and elevation to higher office as the key measures of his success. Accordingly, he must appear to the voters to be effective and responsive to the public will. To his party (and, in the first incarnation of the series, the Prime Minister) he must act as a loyal and effective party member. Sir Humphrey, on the other hand, genuinely believes that the Civil Service, being politically impartial, has the most realistic idea of what "good governance" means, and therefore knows what is best for the country – a belief shared by his bureaucratic colleagues.

Hacker sees the job of government as one of "doing good", or more specifically reforming the country according to his own party's policies: which, more often than not, means the initiation of departmental reforms and economies, a reduction of the level of bureaucracy and reduction of staff numbers in the Civil Service. To do so, or to at least look as if he is doing so, is what he considers to be a vote-winner. Conversely, Sir Humphrey sees his role as ensuring that politics is kept out of government as much as possible and that the status quo is upheld as a matter of principle. But with the status quo notably including the prestige, power and influence of the Civil Service, Sir Humphrey attempts to block any move that seeks either to prevent the further expansion of the civil service or to reduce the complexity of its bureaucracy.

Much of the show's humour thus derives from the antagonism between Cabinet ministers (who believe they are in charge) and the members of the British Civil Service (who believe they really run the country). A typical episode centres on Hacker's suggesting and pursuing a reform and Sir Humphrey's blocking of all Hacker's lines of approach. More often than not, Sir Humphrey prevents him from achieving his goal while mollifying Hacker with some positive publicity, or at least a means to cover up his failure. Occasionally, however, Hacker does get his way, often by thwarting other arrangements or deals that Sir Humphrey has been making behind the scenes elsewhere with other ministers or civil servants. In the case of the episodes "The Skeleton in the Cupboard" and "The Tangled Web", Hacker manages to exploit embarrassing mistakes committed by Sir Humphrey; blackmailing him into adopting his stance. Sir Humphrey occasionally resorts to tactics such as calling a policy "courageous" to remind Hacker to contemplate the view that "a controversial policy will lose votes, whilst a courageous one will lose the election", and thus to hinder the implementation of a particular policy. Sir Humphrey, on the other hand, believes that from the Civil Service's perspective "it makes very little difference who the Minister is".

The character of Bernard Woolley is characterised by a significant degree of ambivalence; largely playing the role of an observer of the cold conflict between Hacker and Sir Humphrey, mostly interjecting only to add a comic effect to the drama albeit occasionally playing a decisive part in determining which adversary triumphs ultimately. Initially, he naively sees his job as the disinterested implementation of the minister's policies, but he gradually finds that this conflicts with his institutional duty to the department, and sometimes (since Sir Humphrey is responsible for formally assessing Woolley's performance) his own potential career development. Consequently, another recurring scenario is one where Bernard must "walk the tightrope" — that is, balance his two conflicting duties by resorting to elaborate verbosity (much like Sir Humphrey) so that he can avoid the appearance of being disloyal to one, in favour of the other. For example, in "The Skeleton in the Cupboard", he sees the importance of notifying Sir Humphrey that Hacker has left his office, whilst still assisting Hacker in his aims. Such is Bernard's success in performing this balancing act, that after the third series, following Sir Humphrey's promotion to Cabinet Secretary, when Hacker becomes Prime Minister he requests that Bernard continue as his Principal Private Secretary, reasserting the perception that he is a "high flier".

Sir Humphrey's personal characteristics include his complicated sentences, his cynical views of government, and his snobbery and superciliousness. Hacker's attributes include occasional indecisiveness, and a tendency to launch into ludicrous Churchillian speeches. Bernard is prone to linguistic pedantry. All characters are able to switch to a completely opposite opinion in seconds when convenient.

=== Casting ===
Nigel Hawthorne had worked with Antony Jay and Jonathan Lynn before, and he and Paul Eddington claimed they immediately recognised the quality of writing of the series, but Jay and Lynn said that both actors asked for a second episode script (and a third script), after having read the pilot script, before committing to the series. When casting the role of Bernard, Jonathan Lynn met Derek Fowlds at a dinner, and subsequently offered him the role.

The first series featured Frank Weisel, Hacker's political advisor (played by Neil Fitzwiliam in the television series, and later by Bill Nighy in the radio series). The first syllable of his surname is pronounced "Wise", but Sir Humphrey and Bernard persistently call him "Weasel". Weisel does not appear after the first series, following his acceptance of a position on a quango (Quasi-Autonomous Non-Governmental Organisation) tasked with investigating the appointment of other quangos, the government's honours system, and "jobs for the boys". The character was dropped because Jay and Lynn thought that the interjection of a character concerned with party political matters distracted from the focus on the tension between the government and the civil service.

The first series of Yes, Prime Minister introduced Dorothy Wainwright (played by Deborah Norton) as a highly able special political advisor to the prime minister. Her experience and insight into many civil service tricks ensure a lasting mutual distrust between her and Sir Humphrey and provide an invaluable second opinion for Hacker. Sir Humphrey frequently annoys Dorothy by addressing her as "dear lady" whereas she occasionally calls him "Humpy".

Hacker's home life is shown occasionally throughout the series. His wife Annie (Diana Hoddinott) is generally supportive, but is sometimes frustrated by the disruptions caused by her husband's political career and is at times somewhat cynical about her husband's politics. In one episode, his sociology student daughter, Lucy (Gerry Cowper), becomes an environmental activist, campaigning against the department's intention to remove protected status from a wooded area believed to be inhabited by badgers. Sir Humphrey assures her there have not been badgers in the woods for some years (leaving open the question of the veracity of his statement).

Sir Humphrey often discusses matters with other Permanent Secretaries, who appear similarly sardonic and jaded, and the Cabinet Secretary (whom he eventually succeeds in Yes, Prime Minister), Sir Arnold Robinson (John Nettleton), an archetype of cynicism, haughtiness and conspiratorial expertise. Sir Frank Gordon, the Permanent Secretary to the Treasury, is a friend and often a rival as they jostle for supremacy within the civil service. The fairly counter-intuitive view of government administration displayed by Sir Humphrey is completely taken for granted by the Civil Service.

== Episodes ==
A total of 38 episodes were made, and all but one are of 30 minutes duration. They were videotaped in front of a studio audience, which was standard BBC practice for situation comedies at the time. The actors did not enjoy filming as they felt that the studio audience placed them under additional pressure. Lynn, however, says that the studio audience on the soundtrack was necessary because laughter is a "communal affair." The laughter also acted as a kind of insurance: Jay observes that politicians would be unable to put pressure on the BBC not to "run this kind of nonsense" if "200–250 people were falling about with laughter." There were occasionally film inserts of location sequences, and some shots of Hacker travelling in his car were achieved by means of chroma key. Each programme usually comprised around six scenes. By the time of Yes, Prime Minister, the producers were permitted to use Downing Street itself for some exterior shots, most notably in the episode "The Key" where Sir Humphrey has to re-enter the building through the door of No.10.

Almost all the episodes (the exceptions chiefly being the earlier ones of the first series) end with one of the characters (usually Sir Humphrey) saying "Yes, Minister", "Yes, Prime Minister", as appropriate, and once, "Mais oui, Prime Minister," in "A Diplomatic Incident" which centred on negotiations with the president of France. Each episode of the former was more or less self-contained, but the first two episodes of Yes, Prime Minister had a loose story arc relating to Hacker's attempts to reform the United Kingdom's armed forces, while the second was mostly devoted to concluding storylines and character arcs that had been seen over the course of Yes Minister.

The pilot was produced in 1979 but not transmitted immediately for fear that it could influence the results of the May 1979 UK General Election. It eventually aired on 25 February 1980. Yes Minister ran for three series, each of seven episodes, between March 1980 and 1982. These were followed by two Christmas specials: one 10-minute sketch as part of an anthology presented by Frank Muir, and then the hour-long "Party Games", in 1984. The latter's events led to Hacker's elevation to Prime Minister, dovetailing into the sequel, Yes, Prime Minister. This ran originally for two series, each of eight episodes, from 1986 to 1988.

In the UK the show has regularly been repeated including on BBC and That's TV channels.

=== Reboot ===
In January 2013, a new series of Yes, Prime Minister was launched on the Gold television channel. Jim Hacker is now portrayed as heading a coalition government, while dealing with an economic downturn, his coalition partner having a leadership crisis, and Scottish independence. The revived series was produced by the BBC for Gold.

== Reception ==
The series gained high audience figures, and 90+ on the audience Appreciation Index. Critics, such as Andrew Davies in the Times Educational Supplement and Armando Iannucci, have noted that the show had high expectations of its audience. Lynn posits that the public are more intelligent than most situation comedies, often patronisingly, give them credit for. Jay believes that the viewers were just as intelligent as the writers, but that there were some things that they needed to know but did not.

Yes Minister won the BAFTA award for Best Comedy Series for 1980, 1981 and 1982, and the "Party Games" special was nominated in the Best Light Entertainment Programme category for 1984. Yes, Prime Minister was short-listed for Best Comedy Series for both 1986 and 1987. Nigel Hawthorne's portrayal of Sir Humphrey Appleby won the BAFTA Award for Best Light Entertainment Performance four times (in 1981, 1982, 1986 and 1987). Eddington was also nominated on all four occasions. Nigel Hawthorne was awarded Best Actor in Light Entertainment Programme at the 1981 Broadcasting Press Guild Awards.

Yes Minister came sixth in a 2004 BBC poll to find 'Britain's Best Sitcom'. In a list of the 100 Greatest British Television Programmes drawn up by the British Film Institute in 2000, voted by industry professionals, Yes Minister and Yes, Prime Minister were both placed ninth. They were also placed 14th in Channel 4's The Ultimate Sitcom, a poll conducted by people who work in sitcoms.

Some political scientists cite the series for its accurate and sophisticated portrayal of the relationships between civil servants and politicians, and are quoted in some textbooks on British politics. Some political scientists considered it a reflection of the public choice model, which encouraged a "conservative agenda of balanced budgets and reduced government spending". The Washington Post considered its "ideas were at the centre of the Thatcher and Ronald Reagan administrations in Britain and the United States, which favored cutting government and shifting its functions to the private sector".

The series was praised by critics and politicians and it was reported that the shows were popular in government circles. The Guinness Television Encyclopedia suggests that "real politicians ... enjoyed the show's cynical dismissal of Whitehall intrigue and its insights into the machinations of government." Lord Donoughue, an admirer of the series who was head of James Callaghan's policy unit at 10 Downing Street from 1976 to 1979, noticed that, when the Labour Party returned to power in 1997 after 18 years in opposition, a number of junior Ministers took so seriously the relationships with civil servants as depicted by Jay and Lynn that they were unduly wary of senior officials and allowed this suspicion to influence their behaviour.

Yes Minister and Yes, Prime Minister were the favourite programme of then Prime Minister, Margaret Thatcher. She told The Daily Telegraph that "its clearly-observed portrayal of what goes on in the corridors of power has given me hours of pure joy." Gerald Kaufman described it as "The Rt Hon. Faust MP, constantly beset by the wiles of Sir Mephistopheles." As a supporter of Thatcher, Jay embraced her appreciation, although the more leftist Lynn was concerned.

Thatcher performed a short sketch with Eddington and Hawthorne on 20 January 1984 at a ceremony where the writers were presented with an award from Mary Whitehouse's NVLA, an event commemorated on the cover of the satirical magazine Private Eye. Authorship of the sketch is unclear. In Britain's Best Sitcom, Bernard Ingham says that he wrote it; other sources give Thatcher sole credit, while Michael Cockerell says that she wrote it with Ingham's help. Another source gives renegade credit to Charles Powell. The actors, who were starring in separate West End plays at the time, were not enthusiastic at the idea and asked Lynn to "get them out" of it. The writer, however, was not in a position to help. Hawthorne says he and Eddington resented Thatcher's attempts to "make capital" from their popularity. Ingham says that it "went down a bomb", while Lynn brands it a "dreadful sketch" that was only funny because Thatcher was doing it. Accepting the award from the NVLA, Lynn thanked Thatcher "for taking her rightful place in the field of situation comedy." Everyone, except the prime minister, laughed. The circumstances surrounding the sketch were dramatised in the 2026 BBC Radio play No, Prime Minister, starring Fenella Woolgar as Thatcher, Miles Jupp as Eddington and Richard Attlee as Hawthorne.

When Paul Eddington visited Australia during the 1980s, he was treated as a visiting British PM by the then Australian leader, Bob Hawke, who was a fan of the show. At a rally, Hawke said "You don't want to be listening to me; you want to be listening to the real Prime Minister", forcing Eddington to improvise. In an interview to promote the first series of Yes, Prime Minister, Derek Fowlds said that "both political sides believe that it satirises their opponents, and civil servants love it because it depicts them as being more powerful than either. And of course, they love it because it's all so authentic." The series was well received in the United States, running on the A&E Network and repeatedly on public television.

=== International remakes ===
In a 2024 interview, Lynn said he and Jay were approached several times about creating an American version of the show, but that they felt that the systems of government were too different. In a 2003 interview, he also said that the American sensibility tended to be more family-oriented or inspirational like The West Wing, but did point to Spin City as having a more satirical approach.

The show has been remade several times internationally, albeit sometimes unofficially.

The series was remade in Portugal in 1996 as Sim, Sr. Ministro by Portuguese channel TVI. The names of characters, locations and institutions were changed to reflect Portuguese reality, but the plot of the episodes follow the originals. A total of 26 episodes were produced and screened between 1996 and 1997.

Not My Department took joint inspiration from Yes Minister and Charles Gordon's The Governor General's Bunny Hop, a contemporary satire of Canadian politics. Unlike Yes Minister, Not My Department was set almost entirely among public servants, with the minister for regional incentive targets only making occasional appearances by video tape—often because he was hoping to evade the latest scandal by taking protracted tours of the regions. Not My Department aired on the Canadian Broadcasting Corporation in 1987.

Ji Mantriji (literally "Yes Minister" in Hindi) is an Indian adaptation of Yes Minister. It was telecast on STAR TV's channel STAR Plus with permission from the BBC. Ji Mantriji features Farooq Sheikh as Surya Prakash Singh, the minister of administrative affairs and Jayant Kripalani as the department's secretary. The plot lines were the same as those of the original, with suitable changes in the Indian context.

Sayın Bakanım ("Dear Minister" in Turkish) is a Turkish adaptation of Yes Minister that ran in 2004. The show featured acclaimed actors Haluk Bilginer, Kenan Isik and Ali Sunal. Sayin Bakanim was cancelled after 14 episodes. Although there were rumours that the show was scrapped because of a warning from the government, the producer of the show denied this. Instead, he explained that the reason was low ratings.

The Australian series The Hollowmen and Utopia were also inspired by Yes Minister.

The Israeli sitcom Polishuk, also modelled on Yes Minister, aired for three series on Channel 2's Keshet Broadcasting.

A Dutch remake had been made by S&V Fiction for VPRO, lasting 11 episodes, called Ja, Bewindsman (Yes Minister). In the Dutch version, Sir Humphrey is a woman and Bernard is a Moroccan called Mohammed.

== In other media ==
=== Theatre ===
Jay and Lynn collaborated again to produce a stage play, titled Yes, Prime Minister. It ran from 13 May to 5 June 2010, at Chichester Festival Theatre. This production revived at the Gielgud Theatre, in London's West End from 17 September 2010 until 15 January 2011. The principal cast was David Haig as Jim Hacker, Henry Goodman as Sir Humphrey, Jonathan Slinger as Bernard Woolley and Emily Joyce as Claire Sutton, Hacker's special policy advisor.

Lynn wrote another play I'm Sorry Prime Minister, I Can't Quite Remember focusing on an ageing retired Hacker and Sir Humphrey. It was first performed in 2023 at the Barn Theatre in Cirencester. Christopher Bianchi played Hacker, whilst Clive Francis portrayed Humphrey. It was announced on May 8th 2025 that a production of I'm Sorry, Prime Minister is to open in London's Apollo Theatre starring Griff Rhys Jones and Clive Francis. The production will run for 12 weeks from the 30th of January 2026.

=== Radio ===
Sixteen episodes of Yes Minister were adapted and re-recorded for broadcast by BBC Radio 4, with the principal cast reprising their roles. Produced by Pete Atkin, they were broadcast across two series, each with eight episodes. The first series aired 18 October to 6 December 1983, with the second originally transmitted 9 October to 27 November 1984. The complete set was released on cassette in February 2000, and on compact disc in October 2002. The series was repeated on the digital radio station BBC Radio 7 in early 2007 and on BBC Radio 4 Extra in November 2013. The series was re-repeated on BBC Radio 4 Extra in 2018.

In 1997, Derek Fowlds reprised the role of Bernard Woolley to read Antony Jay's How To Beat Sir Humphrey: Every Citizen's Guide To Fighting Officialdom. It was broadcast in three daily parts by Radio 4 from 29 September to 1 October 1997 and released by BBC Audiobooks on cassette in October 1997.

== In other countries ==
Both series were aired in Scandinavia and in Finland during the 1980s.

Both series were also aired in the Czech Republic (ČT2) on Friday nights along with other 'britcoms'.

Israel Broadcasting Authority aired both series during the early to mid-1980s where they both gained broad popularity.

After seven episodes of the first series Yes Minister were broadcast on China Central Television in mainland China under the name of Yes, Minister (是，大臣), Chen Xuyi, the former director of the translation and production factory of Shanghai Film Translation Factory, died and as there was no successor to the translator it had to stop. It was not introduced online until 2021. In 2024, it was broadcast on Youku and Bilibili, and BBC Entertainment was introduced in Taiwan, translating it as Minister (部长大人). Hong Kong TVB Pearl has also broadcast this drama. At that time, the Chinese name was Prime Minister, what do you want? (首相你想点).

There have been at least three translation versions of the simplified Chinese version of "Yes Minister" published. The BBC book version of The Complete Yes Minister (遵命大臣：内阁大臣海克尔日记) was published in Beijing in 1991. The Chinese translator was Cheng Hong, whose husband Li Keqiang later became the Prime Minister of People's Republic of China.

Both series aired in the United States on some PBS stations during the 1980s, usually in the Sunday night British Comedy Block, and have aired on PBS stations as recently as 2021 and 2022.

In West Germany, all three series of Yes Minister were aired in 1987 (German title: Yes Minister), and the first series of Yes, Prime Minister in 1988 (German title: Yes Premierminister) on national public broadcaster ARD; repeats occurred during the 1990s on some of the public regional channels. They were broadcast in bilingual mode, permitting owners of a stereo set to select between German overdub and English original sound. Each episode was shortened by about 5 minutes to allow time for the continuity announcer, as was common practice at the time. The second series of Yes Prime Minister was never aired in Germany, thus no German overdub and no German episode titles exist for it. The German DVD release (December 2013) reflects these alterations; it contains the full length episodes, but during the edited portions it throws the German sound back to the English one, and it omits the second series of Yes Prime Minister. The books The Complete Yes Minister and The Complete Yes, Prime Minister were also translated into German as Yes Minister (ISBN 3-442-08636-1) and Yes Premierminister (ISBN 3-442-08892-5), respectively.

In Spain, the series was broadcast under the title of "Sí ministro".

== Merchandise ==
=== Home video releases ===
The BBC issued some episodes of Yes Minister, and all of Yes, Prime Minister on VHS. They were re-released and repackaged at various points. The complete collection was released by the BBC through Warner Home Video on Region 1 DVD in October 2003. Warner appears to have added RCE region coding to the individual release of the second series of Yes Minister, but there are no similar reported problems on playing the complete collection. The BBC, through 2 Entertain Video, also issued several Region 2 DVDs:

- Yes Minister: Series One (BBCDVD1047), released 1 October 2001
- Yes Minister: Series Two (BBCDVD1120), released 30 September 2002
- Yes Minister: Series Three & "Party Games" (BBCDVD1188), released 29 September 2003
- The Complete Yes Minister (BBCDVD1462), released 15 November 2004
- Yes, Prime Minister: Series One (BBCDVD1365), released 4 October 2004
- Yes, Prime Minister: Series Two (BBCDVD1729), released 9 May 2005
- The Complete Yes Minister & Yes, Prime Minister, released 16 October 2006
- Yes Minister & Yes, Prime Minister - The Complete Collection (BBCDVD4448), released 12 October 2020

The 2013 relaunched series on Gold was released on 25 February 2013

- Yes, Prime Minister: Series One

Netflix previously streamed both series to subscribers. All four series are also available for download purchase from iTunes, Amazon Prime Video and similar platforms. Episodes have been made available on BBC iPlayer in the U.K. and Britbox in the United States.

=== Australian/New Zealand releases ===
The Region 4 (Australian/New Zealand) releases took place from 2002 to 2007:

- Yes Minister: Series One, released 2 April 2002
- Yes Minister: Series Two, released 11 February 2002
- Yes Minister: Series Three & "Party Games", released 5 May 2003
- The Complete Yes Minister, released 10 July 2004
- Yes Prime Minister: Series One, released 12 February 2004
- Yes Prime Minister: Series Two, released 7 July 2005
- Yes Prime Minister: Series One and Two (Box Set), released 11 March 2005
- The Complete Yes Minister & Yes, Prime Minister, released 3 October 2007
- Roadshow Entertainment Australia / New Zealand – Search DVD Index

=== Books ===
The series spawned several books. The scripts were edited and transformed into prose, and published by BBC Books in the form of diaries. Scenes that did not involve Hacker took the form of private memos between civil servants, or 'interviews' and written correspondence from other characters. In some instances, the novelizations added extra details, while padding-out some existing details. For example, in the novelization for 'The Official Visit', Sir Humphrey manages to confuse Hacker, by reeling-off a plethora of acronyms—without explaining them, leaving Hacker with nonsense to fathom.

The three series of Yes Minister were published as paperbacks in 1981, 1982 and 1983, respectively, before being combined into a revised hardback omnibus edition, The Complete Yes Minister: The Diaries of a Cabinet Minister, in 1984. Two volumes of Yes, Prime Minister: The Diaries of the Right Hon. James Hacker were published in 1986 and 1987, before being made available as an omnibus edition in 1988. Both series were published as omnibus paperback editions in 1989:

- The Complete Yes Minister ISBN 978-0-563-20665-1
- The Complete Yes, Prime Minister ISBN 0-563-20773-6

Sir Antony Jay's How to Beat Sir Humphrey: Every Citizen's Guide to Fighting Officialdom (ISBN 0-9528285-1-0) was published in April 1997. It was illustrated by Gerald Scarfe and Shaun Williams. It was read by Derek Fowlds on Radio 4 later that year.

The "Yes Minister" Miscellany was released in October 2009.

The script of the play, Yes, Prime Minister, was published in paperback by Faber & Faber in 2010 (ISBN 978-0-571-26070-6).

Graham McCann's 'A Very Courageous Decision: The Inside Story of Yes Minister,' was published by Aurum Books in October 2014 (ISBN 978-1781311899).

=== Video game ===
A Yes, Prime Minister video game was released in 1987 for Amstrad CPC, BBC Micro, Commodore 64, MS-DOS, and ZX Spectrum. The player takes on the role of Prime Minister Jim Hacker for one week as he navigates through meetings with Sir Humphrey, Bernard Woolley, and other government officials, making decisions about seemingly minor government policies which regardless have an effect on the PM's approval rating by the end of the week.

== In popular culture ==
In 2005, BBC Four launched The Thick of It, described by director Armando Iannucci as "Yes Minister meets Larry Sanders", and The Daily Telegraph called it "a Yes, Minister for the Labour years." The style shows many identifiable hallmarks of Yes Minister, namely the blundering politician virtually entirely dependent on those whose presentational and political nous greatly eclipse his own limited abilities.

As an adaptation of The Thick of It, Armando Iannucci also created and directed Veep, an American political satire comedy television series. As the United States has a different political system from United Kingdom's parliamentary system, the show instead focuses on a fictional female vice president of the United States and her staff. Both Yes Minister and Veep feature a prime minister or president that is never depicted on-screen, but nevertheless highly influential in the plot; and in both series, the unseen prime minister or president eventually resigns, with the result that both protagonists later become the prime minister or President themselves.

== Legacy ==
In a 2006 poll, British MPs voted Yes Minister as the greatest political comedy of all time.

In January 2025, the British government announced that a new collection of artificial intelligence tools aimed at helping civil servants with their work would be called Humphrey, named after the Yes Minister character Sir Humphrey Appleby.

== See also ==
- British sitcom
- House of Cards
- The Thick of It
- Political fiction
- List of fictional prime ministers of the United Kingdom
- Mr. President (TV series)
