= Antony Jay =

English writer, broadcaster, and director

Sir Antony Jay CVO CBE
- Born: Antony Rupert Jay; 20 April 1930; Paddington, London, England
- Died: 21 August 2016 (aged 86)
- Occupations: Writer; broadcaster; director

Sir Antony Rupert Jay (20 April 1930 – 21 August 2016) was an English writer and broadcaster. With Jonathan Lynn, he co-wrote the British political-satirical comedies Yes Minister and Yes, Prime Minister (1980–88). He also wrote The Householder's Guide to Community Defence Against Bureaucratic Aggression (1972).

For his career as a broadcaster and in public relations, Jay received a knighthood in the 1988 New Year Honours. He also wrote the 1969 BBC television documentary Royal Family and a 1992 book about Elizabeth II called Elizabeth R, after which he was appointed a Commander of the Royal Victorian Order for personal services to the Royal Family in the 1993 New Years Honours list.

== Early life and education ==
Jay was born in Paddington, London, the son of Catherine (née Hay) and Ernest Jay, a character actor. He was educated at St Paul's School and Magdalene College, Cambridge, graduating with first-class honours in Classics and comparative philology.

== Career ==
After National Service in the Royal Signals, Jay joined BBC Television in 1955, and was a member of the team that launched the current affairs programme Tonight, of which he was editor from 1962 to 1963. From 1963 to 1964 he was Head of Television Talk Features, before leaving the BBC (on 8 April 1964) to pursue a career as a freelance writer and producer.

In politics he rendered political services to the Conservative Party of Margaret Thatcher, which included writing speeches for politicians including Geoffrey Howe.

He was knighted in 1988 and remained a mordant observer of politics, including those of the broadcasters themselves. He was interviewed in the BBC TV documentary series Tory! Tory! Tory! and The Trap. Jay was a partner with John Cleese in the Video Arts training film production company.

== Views and advocacy ==
Jay's political views were right-wing and he was a supporter of market economics. In 2007, he alleged anti-establishment thinking by the BBC and news media outlets such as The Guardian. He said of his time working at the BBC: "We were not just anti-Macmillan. We were anti-industry, anti-capitalism, anti-advertising, anti-selling, anti-profit, anti-patriotism, anti-monarchy, anti-Empire, anti-police, anti-armed forces, anti-bomb, anti-authority. Almost anything that made the world a freer, safer and more prosperous place, you name it, we were anti it."

His 2008 report for the Centre for Policy Studies, How to Save the BBC, advocated the abolition of the licence fee and the television service being reduced to one channel.

== Books ==
Jay wrote books on management and business practices. His first best-seller, Management and Machiavelli (1967), originally sold 250,000 copies worldwide. This was followed by an analysis of how business really worked in the 20th century. Corporation Man (1971) was described at the time as "a brilliant mixture of evolutionary theory drawn from such works as African Genesis and The Naked Ape". His Householders' Guide to Community Defence Against Bureaucratic Aggression was published in 1972.

== Death ==
Jay died on 21 August 2016 at the age of 86.

== Family ==
Jay married Jill Watkins in 1957; they had four children.
