= Inverse (logic) =

Concept in mathematical logic

In logic, an inverse is a type of conditional sentence which is an immediate inference made from another conditional sentence. More specifically, given a conditional sentence of the form $P \rightarrow Q$, the inverse refers to the sentence $\neg P \rightarrow \neg Q$. Since an inverse is the contrapositive of the converse, inverse and converse are logically equivalent to each other.

For example, substituting propositions in natural language for logical variables, the inverse of the following conditional proposition

"If it's raining, then Sam will meet Jack at the movies."

would be

"If it's not raining, then Sam will not meet Jack at the movies."

The inverse of the inverse, that is, the inverse of $\neg P \rightarrow \neg Q$, is $\neg \neg P \rightarrow \neg \neg Q$, and since the double negation of any statement is equivalent to the original statement in classical logic, the inverse of the inverse is logically equivalent to the original conditional $P \rightarrow Q$. Thus it is permissible to say that $\neg P \rightarrow \neg Q$ and $P \rightarrow Q$ are inverses of each other. Likewise, $P \rightarrow \neg Q$ and $\neg P \rightarrow Q$ are inverses of each other.

The inverse and the converse of a conditional are logically equivalent to each other, just as the conditional and its contrapositive are logically equivalent to each other. But the inverse of a conditional cannot be inferred from the conditional itself (e.g., the conditional might be true while its inverse might be false). For example, the sentence

"If it's not raining, Sam will not meet Jack at the movies"

cannot be inferred from the sentence

"If it's raining, Sam will meet Jack at the movies"

because in the case where it's not raining, additional conditions may still prompt Sam and Jack to meet at the movies, such as:

"If it's not raining and Jack is craving popcorn, Sam will meet Jack at the movies."

In traditional logic, where there are four named types of categorical propositions, only forms A (i.e., "All S are P") and E ("All S are not P") have an inverse. To find the inverse of these categorical propositions, one must: replace the subject and the predicate of the inverted by their respective contradictories, and change the quantity from universal to particular. That is:

- "All S are P" (A form) becomes "Some non-S are non-P".
- "All S are not P" (E form) becomes "Some non-S are not non-P".

== See also ==
- Contraposition
- Converse (logic)
- Obversion
- Transposition (logic)
