= Logical quality =

Philosophical categorization of statements

In many philosophies of logic, statements are categorized into different logical qualities based on how they go about saying what they say. Doctrines of logical quality are an attempt to answer the question: "How many qualitatively different ways are there of saying something?" Aristotle answers, two: you can affirm something of something or deny something of something. Since Frege, the normal answer in the West, is only one, assertion, but what is said, the content of the claim, can vary. For Frege asserting the negation of a claim serves roughly the same role as denying a claim does in Aristotle. Other Western logicians such as Kant and Hegel answer, ultimately three; you can affirm, deny or make merely limiting affirmations, which transcend both affirmation and denial. In Indian logic, four logical qualities have been the norm, and Nāgārjuna is sometimes interpreted as arguing for five.

== Aristotle's two logical qualities ==
In Aristotle's term logic there are two logical qualities: affirmation (kataphasis) and denial (apophasis). The logical quality of a proposition is whether it is affirmative (the predicate is affirmed of the subject) or negative (the predicate is denied of the subject). Thus "every man is a mortal" is affirmative, since "mortal" is affirmed of "man". "No men are immortals" is negative, since "immortal" is denied of "man".

== Making do with a single logical quality ==
Logical quality has become much less central to logical theory in the twentieth century. It has become common to use only one logical quality, typically called logical assertion. Much of the work previously done by distinguishing affirmation from denial is typically now done through the theory of negation. Thus, to most contemporary logicians, making a denial is essentially reducible to affirming a negation. Denying that Socrates is ill, is the same thing as affirming that it is not the case that Socrates is ill, which is basically affirming that Socrates is not ill. This trend may go back to Frege although his notation for negation is ambiguous between asserting a negation and denying. Gentzen's notation definitely assimilates denial to assertion of negation, but might not quite have a single logical quality, see below.

== Third logical qualities ==
Logicians in the western traditions have often expressed belief in some other logical quality besides affirmation and denial. Sextus Empiricus, in the 2nd or 3rd century CE, argued for the existence of "nonassertive" statements, which indicate suspension of judgment by refusing to affirm or deny anything. Pseudo-Dionysius the Areopagite in the 6th century, argued for the existence of "non-privatives", which transcend both affirmation and denial. For example, it is not quite correct to affirm that God is, nor to deny that God moves, but rather one should say that God is beyond-motion, or super-motive, and this is intended not just as a special kind of affirmation or denial, but a third move besides affirmation and denial.

For Kant every judgment takes one of three possible logical qualities, Affirmative, Negative or Infinite. For Kant, if I say “The soul is mortal” I have made an affirmation about the soul; I have said something contentful about it. If I say “The soul is not mortal,” I have made a negative judgment and thus “warded off error” but I have not said what the soul is instead. If, however, I say “The soul is non-mortal,” I have made an infinite judgment. For the purposes of “General logic” it is sufficient to see infinite judgments as a sub-variety of affirmative judgments, I have said something of the soul, namely that it is not mortal. But from the standpoint of “Transcendental Logic” it is important to distinguish the infinite from the affirmative. Although I have taken something away from the possibilities of what the soul might be like, I have not thereby said what it is or clarified the concept of the soul, there are still an infinite number of possible ways the soul could be. The content of an infinite judgment is purely limitative of our knowledge rather than ampliative of it. Hegel follows Kant in insisting that, at least transcendentally, affirmation and negation are not enough but require a third logical quality sublating them both.

== The Indian tradition ==
In Indian logic it has long been traditional to claim that there are four kinds of claims. You can affirm that X is so, you can deny that X is so, you can neither-affirm-nor-deny that X is so, or you can both-affirm-and-deny that X is so. Each claim can also take one of four truth-values true, false, neither-true-nor-false, and both-true-and-false. However the tradition is clear that the four kinds of statements are distinct from the four values of statements. Nāgārjuna is sometimes interpreted as teaching that there is a fifth logical quality besides the four typical of Indian logic, but there are disputing interpretations.

== More than one quality today ==
Although the distinction between affirmation and denial is rarely supported today, you might try to argue that some other distinctions in the structure of assertion could be thought of as differences of logical quality. One might argue, for instance, that the distinction between sequents with empty and non-empty antecedents amounts to a distinction between logical consequences and logical assertions. Alternately one might claim that both forms are really just logical assertions in the metalanguage, and are not statements at all in the object language, since the turnstile isn't in the object language. Similarly you might argue that a modern language that includes both an assertion mechanism, and a "retraction" mechanism (such as Diderik Batens' "Adaptive Logics") could be thought of as having two logical qualities "assertion" and "retraction."
