= Obversion =

Immediate inference in logic

In traditional logic, obversion is a "type of immediate inference in which from a given proposition another proposition is inferred whose subject is the same as the original subject, whose predicate is the contradictory of the original predicate, and whose quality is affirmative if the original proposition's quality was negative and vice versa". The quality of the inferred categorical proposition is changed but the truth value is the same to the original proposition. The immediately inferred proposition is termed the "obverse" of the original proposition, and is a valid form of inference for all types (A, E, I, O) of categorical propositions.

In a universal affirmative and a universal negative proposition the subject term and the predicate term are both replaced by their negated counterparts:

The universal affirmative ("A" proposition) is obverted to a universal negative ("E" proposition).

"All S are P" and "No S are non-P"

"All cats are animals" and "No cats are non-animals"

The universal negative ("E" proposition) is obverted to a universal affirmative ("A" proposition).

"No S are P" and "All S are non-P"

"No cats are friendly" and "All cats are non-friendly"

In the particular affirmative the quantity of the subject term remains unchanged, but the predicate term of the inferred proposition negates the complement of the predicate term of the original proposition. The particular affirmative ("I" proposition) is obverted to a particular negative ("O" proposition).

"Some S are P" and "Some S are not non-P"

"Some animals are friendly creatures" and "Some animals are not unfriendly creatures."

In the obversion of a particular negative to a particular affirmative the quantity of the subject also remains unchanged, and the predicate term is changed from simple negation to a term of the complementary class. The particular negative ("O") proposition is obverted to a particular affirmative ("I" proposition).

"Some S are not P" and "Some S are non-P"

"Some animals are not friendly creatures" and "Some animals are unfriendly creatures."

Note that the truth-value of an original statement is preserved in its resulting obverse form. Because of this, obversion can be used to determine the immediate inferences of all categorical propositions, regardless of quality or quantity.

In addition, obversion allows us to navigate through the traditional square of logical opposition by providing a means to proceed from "A" Propositions to "E" Propositions, as well as from "I" Propositions to "O" Propositions, and vice versa. However, although the resulting propositions from obversion are logically equivalent to the original statements in terms of truth-value, they are not semantically equivalent to their original statements in their standard form.

== See also ==
- Aristotle
- Categorical proposition § Obversion
- Contraposition
- Conversion (logic)
- Inference
- Syllogism
- Term logic
- Transposition (logic)

== Bibliography ==
- Brody, Bobuch A. "Glossary of Logical Terms". Encyclopedia of Philosophy. Vol. 5–6. Macmillan, 1973.
- Copi, Irving. Introduction to Logic. MacMillan, 1953.
- Copi, Irving. Symbolic Logic. MacMillan, 1979, fifth edition.
- Stebbing, Susan. A Modern Introduction to Logic. Cromwell Company, 1931.
