= Direct proof =

Way of arriving to a mathematical proof

In mathematics and logic, a direct proof is a way of showing the truth or falsehood of a given statement by a straightforward combination of established facts, usually axioms, existing lemmas and theorems, without making any further assumptions. In order to directly prove a conditional statement of the form "If p, then q", it suffices to consider the situations in which the statement p is true. Logical deduction is employed to reason from assumptions to conclusion. The type of logic employed is almost invariably first-order logic, employing the quantifiers for all and there exists. Common proof rules used are modus ponens and universal instantiation.

In contrast, an indirect proof may begin with certain hypothetical scenarios and then proceed to eliminate the uncertainties in each of these scenarios until an inescapable conclusion is forced. For example, instead of showing directly p ⇒ q, one proves its contrapositive ~q ⇒ ~p (one assumes ~q and shows that it leads to ~p). Since p ⇒ q and ~q ⇒ ~p are equivalent by the principle of transposition (see law of excluded middle), p ⇒ q is indirectly proved. Proof methods that are not direct include proof by contradiction, including proof by infinite descent. Direct proof methods include proof by exhaustion and proof by induction.

== History and etymology ==
A direct proof is the simplest form of proof there is. The word ‘proof’ comes from the Latin word probare, which means “to test”. The earliest use of proofs was prominent in legal proceedings. A person with authority, such as a nobleman, was said to have probity, which means that the evidence was by his relative authority, which outweighed empirical testimony. In days gone by, mathematics and proof was often intertwined with practical questions – with populations like the Egyptians and the Greeks showing an interest in surveying land. This led to a natural curiosity with regards to geometry and trigonometry – particularly triangles and rectangles. These were the shapes which provided the most questions in terms of practical things, so early geometrical concepts were focused on these shapes, for example, the likes of buildings and pyramids used these shapes in abundance. Another shape which is crucial in the history of direct proof is the circle, which was crucial for the design of arenas and water tanks. This meant that ancient geometry (and Euclidean Geometry) discussed circles.

The earliest form of mathematics was phenomenological. For example, if someone could draw a reasonable picture, or give a convincing description, then that met all the criteria for something to be described as a mathematical “fact”. On occasion, analogical arguments took place, or even by “invoking the gods”. The idea that mathematical statements could be proven had not been developed yet, so these were the earliest forms of the concept of proof, despite not being actual proof at all.

Proof as we know it came about with one specific question: “what is a proof?” Traditionally, a proof is a platform which convinces someone beyond reasonable doubt that a statement is mathematically true. Naturally, one would assume that the best way to prove the truth of something like this (B) would be to draw up a comparison with something old (A) that has already been proven as true. Thus was created the concept of deriving a new result from an old result.

== Examples ==
=== The sum of two even integers equals an even integer ===
Consider two even integers x and y. Since they are even, they can be written as

$$x =2a$$
$$y=2b$$

respectively for integers a and b. Then the sum can be written as

$x+y = 2a + 2b = 2(a+b)=2p$ where $p=a+b$, a and b are all integers.

It follows that x + y has 2 as a factor and therefore is even, so the sum of any two even integers is even.

=== Pythagoras' theorem ===
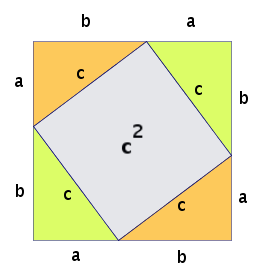
Diagram of Pythagoras Theorem

Observe that we have four right-angled triangles and a square packed into a larger square. Each of the triangles has sides a and b and hypotenuse c. The area of a square is defined as the square of the length of its sides. In this case, the area of the large square is (a + b)^{2}. However, the area of the large square can also be expressed as the sum of the areas of its components. In this case, that would be the sum of the areas of the four triangles and the small square in the middle.

We know that the area of the large square is equal to (a + b)^{2}.

The area of a right triangle is equal to $\frac12ab.$

We know that the area of the large square is also equal to the sum of the areas of the triangles, plus the area of the small square, and thus the area of the large square equals $4(\frac 12 ab) + c^2.$

These are equal, and so

$$(a + b)^2 = 4(\frac 12 ab) + c^2 .$$

After some simplifying,

$$a^2 + 2ab + b^2 = 2ab + c^2 .$$

Removing the 2ab that appears on both sides gives

$$a^2 + b^2 = c^2 ,$$

which proves Pythagoras' theorem. ∎

=== The square of an odd number is also odd ===
By definition, if n is an odd integer, it can be expressed as

$$n = 2k + 1$$

for some integer k. Thus

$$\begin{align}
n^2 &= (2k + 1)^2\\
&= (2k + 1)(2k + 1)\\
&=4k^2 + 2k + 2k + 1\\
&=4k^2 + 4k + 1\\
&=2(2k^2 + 2k) + 1.
\end{align}$$

Since 2k^{2}+ 2k is an integer, n^{2} is also odd. ∎

== Sources ==
- Franklin, J.; A. Daoud (2011). Proof in Mathematics: An Introduction. Sydney: Kew Books. ISBN 978-0-646-54509-7. (Ch. 1.)
