= Baroco =

Diagram of a Baroco syllogism

In Aristotelian logic, baroco is a mnemonic word used to memorize a class of syllogism. Specifically, it has the first proposition universal and affirmative, but the second and third particular and negative, and the middle term the attribute in the two first. For example,

Every virtue is attended with discretion.
Some kinds of zeal are not attended with discretion.
Therefore, some kinds of zeal are not virtues.

In the terminology of Aristotelian logic, a Baroco is one of the four syllogisms of the second figure of the nineteen modes (or one of the six syllogisms of the second figure of the twenty-four modes if the weakened modes are included). It includes: a relation to a syllogism (Barbara) of the first figure of type B; major premise of type A; a minor premise of type O; the minor premise of the second figure (minor term/copula/middle term) of type C; a conclusion of type O; that is to say a universal major affirmative, a particular minor negative, and a particular negative conclusion.

A modern example of a Baroco syllogism is:

1. All saucers can be used as frisbees:
2. Some metal objects cannot be used as frisbees:
3. Therefore, some metal objects are not saucers.

== Baroco and Baroque ==
In the 16th century the term Baroco moved beyond philosophy and began to be used to describe anything that was overly and absurdly complex. The French philosopher Michel de Montaigne associated the term 'baroco' with "Bizarre and uselessly complicated." Other early sources associated the term with magic, complexity, confusion, and excess.

In the 18th century, the term was sometimes also used to describe music, and was not flattering. In an anonymous satirical review of the première of Jean-Philippe Rameau's Hippolyte et Aricie in October 1733, which was printed in the Mercure de France in May 1734, the critic wrote that the novelty in this opera was "du barocque", complaining that the music lacked coherent melody, was unsparing with dissonances, constantly changed key and meter, and speedily ran through every compositional device.

In 1762, Le Dictionnaire de l'Académie française wrote that the term could be used figuratively to describe something "irregular, bizarre or unequal."

Jean-Jacques Rousseau, who was a musician and composer as well as philosopher, wrote in 1768 in the Encyclopédie: "Baroque music is that in which the harmony is confused, and loaded with modulations and dissonances. The singing is harsh and unnatural, the intonation difficult, and the movement limited. It appears that term comes from the word 'baroco' used by logicians."
