= Categorical proposition =

Statement regarding whether or not an item belongs to a category

In logic, a categorical proposition, or categorical statement, is a proposition that asserts or denies that all or some of the members of one category (the subject term) are included in another (the predicate term). The study of arguments using categorical statements (i.e., syllogisms) forms an important branch of deductive reasoning that began with the Ancient Greeks.

The Ancient Greeks, such as Aristotle, identified four primary distinct types of categorical propositions and gave them standard forms (now often called A, E, I, and O). If, abstractly, the subject category is named S and the predicate category is named P, the four standard forms are:

- All S are P. (A form)
- No S are P. (E form)
- Some S are P. (I form)
- Some S are not P. (O form)

A large number of sentences may be translated into one of these canonical forms while retaining all or most of the original meaning of the sentence. Greek investigations resulted in the so-called square of opposition, which codifies the logical relations among the different forms; for example, that an A-statement is contradictory to an O-statement; that is to say, for example, if one believes "All apples are red fruits," one cannot simultaneously believe that "Some apples are not red fruits." Thus, the relationships of the square of opposition may allow immediate inference, whereby the truth or falsity of one of the forms may follow directly from the truth or falsity of a statement in another form.

Modern understanding of categorical propositions (originating with the mid-19th century work of George Boole) requires one to consider if the subject category may be empty. If so, this is called the hypothetical viewpoint, in opposition to the existential viewpoint which requires the subject category to have at least one member. The existential viewpoint is a stronger stance than the hypothetical and, when it is appropriate to take, it allows one to deduce more results than otherwise could be made. The hypothetical viewpoint, being the weaker view, has the effect of removing some of the relations present in the traditional square of opposition.

Arguments consisting of three categorical propositions – two as premises and one as conclusion – are known as categorical syllogisms and were of paramount importance from the times of ancient Greek logicians through the Middle Ages. Although formal arguments using categorical syllogisms have largely given way to the increased expressive power of modern logic systems like the first-order predicate calculus, they still retain practical value in addition to their historic and pedagogical significance.

== Translating statements into standard form ==
Sentences in natural language may be translated into standard forms. In each row of the following chart, S corresponds to the subject of the example sentence, and P corresponds to the predicate.

| Name | English Sentence | Standard Form | S | P |
|---|---|---|---|---|
| A | All cats have four legs. | All S are P. | cats | (creatures with) four legs |
| E | No cats have eight legs. | No S are P. | cats | (creatures with) eight legs |
| I | Some cats are orange. | Some S are P. | cats | (things colored) orange |
| O | Some cats are not black. | Some S are not P. | cats | (things colored) black |

Note that "All S are not P" (e.g., "All cats do not have eight legs") is not classified as an example of the standard forms. This is because the translation to natural language is ambiguous. In common speech, the sentence "All cats do not have eight legs" could be used informally to indicate either (1) "At least some, and perhaps all, cats do not have eight legs" or (2) "No cats have eight legs".

== Properties of categorical propositions ==
Categorical propositions can be categorized into four types on the basis of their "quality" and "quantity", or their "distribution of terms". These four types have long been named A, E, I, and O. This is based on the Latin affirmo (I affirm), referring to the affirmative propositions A and I, and nego (I deny), referring to the negative propositions E and O.

=== Quantity and quality ===
Quantity refers to the number of members of the subject class (A class is a collection or group of things designated by a term that is either subject or predicate in a categorical proposition.) that are used in the proposition. If the proposition refers to all members of the subject class, it is universal. If the proposition does not employ all members of the subject class, it is particular. For instance, an I-proposition ("Some S are P") is particular since it only refers to some of the members of the subject class.

Quality It is described as whether the proposition affirms or denies the inclusion of a subject within the class of the predicate. The two possible qualities are called affirmative and negative. For instance, an A-proposition ("All S are P") is affirmative since it states that the subject is contained within the predicate. On the other hand, an O-proposition ("Some S are not P") is negative since it excludes the subject from the predicate.

The Four Aristotelian Propositions
| Name | Statement | Quantity | Quality |
|---|---|---|---|
| A | All S are P. | universal | affirmative |
| E | No S are P. | universal | negative |
| I | Some S are P. | particular | affirmative |
| O | Some S are not P. | particular | negative |

An important consideration is the definition of the word some. In logic, some refers to "one or more", which is consistent with "all". Therefore, the statement "Some S are P" does not guarantee that the statement "Some S are not P" is also true.

=== Distributivity ===
The two terms (subject and predicate) in a categorical proposition may each be classified as distributed or undistributed. If all members of the term's class are affected by the proposition, that class is distributed; otherwise it is undistributed. Every proposition therefore has one of four possible distribution of terms.

Each of the four canonical forms will be examined in turn regarding its distribution of terms. Although not developed here, Venn diagrams are sometimes helpful when trying to understand the distribution of terms for the four forms.

==== A form (otherwise known as universal affirmative) ====
An A-proposition distributes the subject to the predicate, but not the reverse. Consider the following categorical proposition: "All dogs are mammals". All dogs are indeed mammals, but it would be false to say all mammals are dogs. Since all dogs are included in the class of mammals, "dogs" is said to be distributed to "mammals". Since all mammals are not necessarily dogs, "mammals" is undistributed to "dogs".

==== E form (otherwise known as universal negative) ====
An E-proposition distributes bidirectionally between the subject and predicate. From the categorical proposition "No beetles are mammals", we can infer that no mammals are beetles. Since all beetles are defined not to be mammals, and all mammals are defined not to be beetles, both classes are distributed.

The empty set is a particular case of subject and predicate class distribution.

==== I form (otherwise known as particular affirmative) ====
Both terms in an I-proposition are undistributed. For example, "Some Americans are conservatives". Neither term can be entirely distributed to the other. From this proposition, it is not possible to say that all Americans are conservatives or that all conservatives are Americans. Note the ambiguity in the statement: It could either mean that "Some Americans (or other) are conservatives" (de dicto), or it could mean that "Some Americans (in particular, Albert and Bob) are conservatives" (de re).

==== O form (otherwise known as particular negative) ====
In an O-proposition, only the predicate is distributed. Consider the following: "Some politicians are not corrupt". Since not all politicians are defined by this rule, the subject is undistributed. The predicate, though, is distributed because all the members of "corrupt people" will not match the group of people defined as "some politicians". Since the rule applies to every member of the corrupt people group, namely, "All corrupt people are not some politicians", the predicate is distributed.

The distribution of the predicate in an O-proposition is often confusing due to its ambiguity. When a statement such as "Some politicians are not corrupt" is said to distribute the "corrupt people" group to "some politicians", the information seems of little value, since the group "some politicians" is not defined; This is the de dicto interpretation of the intensional statement ($\Box \exists{x} [Pl_{x}\land \neg C_x]$), or "Some politicians (or other) are not corrupt". But if, as an example, this group of "some politicians" were defined to contain a single person, Albert, the relationship becomes clearer; This is the de re interpretation of the intensional statement ($\exists{x} \Box [Pl_{x}\land \neg C_x]$), or "Some politicians (in particular) are not corrupt". The statement would then mean that, of every entry listed in the corrupt people group, not one of them will be Albert: "All corrupt people are not Albert". This is a definition that applies to every member of the "corrupt people" group, and is, therefore, distributed.

==== Summary ====
In short, for the subject to be distributed, the statement must be universal (e.g., "all", "no"). For the predicate to be distributed, the statement must be negative (e.g., "no", "not").

| Name | Statement | Distribution | |
| Name | Statement | Subject | Predicate |
|---|---|---|---|
| A | All S are P. | distributed | undistributed |
| E | No S are P. | distributed | distributed |
| I | Some S are P. | undistributed | undistributed |
| O | Some S are not P. | undistributed | distributed |

==== Criticism ====
Peter Geach and others have criticized the use of distribution to determine the validity of an argument.

It has been suggested that statements of the form "Some S are not P" would be less problematic if stated as "Not every S is P," which is perhaps a closer translation to Aristotle's original form for this type of statement.

Another criticism is that there is a little step from "All corrupt people are not some politicians" to "All corrupt people are not politicians" (whether meaning "No corrupt people are politicians" or "Not all corrupt people are politicians", which are different from the original "Some politicians are not corrupt"), or to "Every corrupt person is not some politician" (also different).

== Operations on categorical statements ==
There are several operations (e.g., conversion, obversion, and contraposition) that can be performed on a categorical statement to change it into another. The new statement may or may not be equivalent to the original. [In the following tables that illustrate such operations, at each row, boxes are green if statements in one green box are equivalent to statements in another green box, boxes are red if statements in one red box are inequivalent to statements in another red box. Statements in a yellow box means that these are implied or valid by the statement in the left-most box when the condition stated in the same yellow box is satisfied.]

Some operations require the notion of the class complement. This refers to every element under consideration which is not an element of the class. Class complements are very similar to set complements. The class complement of a set P will be called "non-P".

=== Conversion ===
The simplest operation is conversion where the subject and predicate terms are interchanged. Note that this is not the same as the implicational converse in the modern logic where a material implication statement $P \rightarrow Q$ is converted (conversion) to another material implication statement $Q \rightarrow P$. Both conversions are equivalent only for A type categorical statements.

| Name | Statement | Converse / Obverted Converse | Subaltern / Obverted Subaltern / Condition of Validity | Converse per accidens / Obverted Converse per accidens / Condition of Validity |
|---|---|---|---|---|
| A | All S are P. | All P are S. No P are non-S. | Some S are P. Some S are not non-P. (if S exists) | Some P are S. Some P are not non-S. (if S exists) |
| E | No S are P. | No P are S. All P are non-S. | Some S are not P. Some S are non-P. (if S exists) | Some P are not S. Some P are non-S. (if P exists) |
| I | Some S are P. | Some P are S. Some P are not non-S. | —N/a | |
| O | Some S are not P. | Some P are not S. Some P are non-S. | —N/a | |

From a statement in E or I form, it is valid to conclude its converse (as they are equivalent). This is not the case for the A and O forms.

=== Obversion ===
Obversion changes the quality (that is the affirmativity or negativity) of the statement and the predicate term. For example, by obversion, a universal affirmative statement become a universal negative statement with the predicate term that is the class complement of the predicate term of the original universal affirmative statement. In the modern forms of the four categorical statements, the negation of the statement corresponding to a predicate term P, $\neg Px$, is interpreted as a predicate term 'non-P' in each categorical statement in obversion. The equality of $Px = \neg (\neg Px)$ can be used to obvert affirmative categorical statements.

| Name | Statement | Obverse (obverted) |
|---|---|---|
| A | All S are P. | No S are non-P. |
| E | No S are P. | All S are non-P. |
| I | Some S are P. | Some S are not non-P. |
| O | Some S are not P. | Some S are non-P. |

Categorical statements are logically equivalent to their obverse. As such, a Venn diagram illustrating any one of the forms would be identical to the Venn diagram illustrating its obverse.

=== Contraposition ===
Contraposition is the process of simultaneous interchange and negation of the subject and predicate of a categorical statement. It is also equivalent to converting (applying conversion) the obvert (the outcome of obversion) of a categorical statement. Note that this contraposition in the traditional logic is not the same as the contraposition (also called transposition) in the modern logic where the material implication statements $P \rightarrow Q$ and $\neg Q \rightarrow \neg P$ are logically equivalent. Both contrapositions are equivalent only for A type categorical statements.

| Name | Statement | Contrapositive / Obverted Contrapositive | Contrapositive per accidens / Obverted Contrapositive per accidens / Condition of Validity |
|---|---|---|---|
| A | All S are P. | All non-P are non-S. No non-P are S. | Some non-P are non-S. Some non-P are not S. (if non-P exists) |
| E | No S are P. | No non-P are non-S. All non-P are S. | Some non-P are not non-S. Some non-P are S. (if S exists) |
| I | Some S are P. | Some non-P are non-S. Some non-P are not S. | —N/a |
| O | Some S are not P. | Some non-P are not non-S. Some non-P are S. | —N/a |

== Treatment in first-order logic ==
First-order logic is a much more expressive logic than that given by categorical propositions. In first order logic, the four forms can be expressed as:

- A form: $\forall{x} [S_{x}\rightarrow P_x]\equiv \forall{x} [\neg S_{x}\lor P_x]$
- E form: $\forall{x} [S_{x}\rightarrow \neg P_x]\equiv \forall{x} [\neg S_{x}\lor \neg P_x]$
- I form: $\exists{x} [S_{x}\land P_x]$
- O form: $\exists{x} [S_{x}\land\neg P_x]$

== See also ==
- Predication (traditionally expressed in logic through the form of the categorical proposition)
- Term logic
