= Immediate inference =

Logical inference from a single statement

An immediate inference is an inference which can be made from only one statement or proposition. For instance, from the statement "All toads are green", the immediate inference can be made that "no toads are not green" or "no toads are non-green" (Obverse). There are a number of immediate inferences which can validly be made using logical operations. There are also invalid immediate inferences which are syllogistic fallacies.

== Valid immediate inferences ==
=== Converse ===
- Given a type E statement, "No S are P.", one can make the immediate inference that "No P are S" which is the converse of the given statement.
- Given a type I statement, "Some S are P.", one can make the immediate inference that "Some P are S" which is the converse of the given statement.

=== Obverse ===
- Given a type A statement, "All S are P.", one can make the immediate inference that "No S are non-P" which is the obverse of the given statement.
- Given a type E statement, "No S are P.", one can make the immediate inference that "All S are non-P" which is the obverse of the given statement.
- Given a type I statement, "Some S are P.", one can make the immediate inference that "Some S are not non-P" which is the obverse of the given statement.
- Given a type O statement, "Some S are not P.", one can make the immediate inference that "Some S are non-P" which is the obverse of the given statement.

=== Contrapositive ===
- Given a type A statement, "All S are P.", one can make the immediate inference that "All non-P are non-S" which is the contrapositive of the given statement.
- Given a type O statement, "Some S are not P.", one can make the immediate inference that "Some non-P are not non-S" which is the contrapositive of the given statement.

== Invalid immediate inferences ==
Cases of the incorrect application of the contrary, subcontrary and subalternation relations (these hold in the traditional square of opposition, not the modern square of opposition) are syllogistic fallacies called illicit contrary, illicit subcontrary, and illicit subalternation, respectively. Cases of incorrect application of the contradictory relation (this relation holds in both the traditional and modern squares of opposition) are so infrequent, that an "illicit contradictory" fallacy is usually not recognized. The below shows examples of these cases.

=== Illicit contrary ===
- It is false that all A are B, therefore no A are B.
- It is false that no A are B, therefore all A are B.

=== Illicit subcontrary ===
- Some A are B, therefore it is false that some A are not B.
- Some A are not B, therefore some A are B.

=== Illicit subalternation and illicit superalternation ===
- Some A are not B, therefore no A are B.
- It is false that all A are B, therefore it is false that some A are B.

== See also ==
- Transposition (logic)
- Inverse (logic)
