= Contradiction =

Logical incompatibility between two or more propositions

This diagram shows the contradictory relationships between categorical propositions in the square of opposition of Aristotelian logic.

In traditional logic, a contradiction involves a proposition conflicting either with itself or established fact. It is often used as a tool to detect disingenuous beliefs and bias. Illustrating a general tendency in applied logic. The law of noncontradiction states that "It is impossible that the same thing can at the same time both belong and not belong to the same object and in the same respect."

In modern formal logic and type theory, the term is mainly used instead for a single proposition, often denoted by the falsum symbol $\bot$; a proposition is a contradiction if false can be derived from it, using the rules of the logic. It is a proposition that is unconditionally false (i.e., a self-contradictory proposition). This can be generalized to a collection of propositions, which is then said to "contain" a contradiction.

== History ==
By creation of a paradox, Plato's Euthydemus dialogue demonstrates the need for the notion of contradiction. In the ensuing dialogue, Dionysodorus denies the existence of "contradiction", all the while that Socrates is contradicting him:

... I in my astonishment said: What do you mean Dionysodorus? I have often heard, and have been amazed to hear, this thesis of yours, which is maintained and employed by the disciples of Protagoras and others before them, and which to me appears to be quite wonderful, and suicidal as well as destructive, and I think that I am most likely to hear the truth about it from you. The dictum is that there is no such thing as a falsehood; a man must either say what is true or say nothing. Is not that your position?

Indeed, Dionysodorus agrees that "there is no such thing as false opinion ... there is no such thing as ignorance", and demands of Socrates to "Refute me." Socrates responds "But how can I refute you, if, as you say, to tell a falsehood is impossible?".

== In formal logic ==
In classical logic, particularly in propositional and first-order logic, a proposition $\varphi$ is a contradiction if and only if $\varphi\vdash\bot$. Since for contradictory $\varphi$ it is true that $\vdash\varphi\rightarrow\psi$ for all $\psi$ (because $\bot\vdash\psi$), one may prove any proposition from a set of axioms which contains contradictions. This is called the "principle of explosion", or "ex falso quodlibet" ("from falsity, anything follows").

In a complete logic, a formula is contradictory if and only if it is unsatisfiable.

=== Proof by contradiction ===
For a set of consistent premises $\Sigma$ and a proposition $\varphi$, it is true in classical logic that $\Sigma \vdash\varphi$ (i.e., $\Sigma$ proves $\varphi$) if and only if $\Sigma \cup \{\neg\varphi\} \vdash \bot$ (i.e., $\Sigma$ and $\neg\varphi$ leads to a contradiction). Therefore, a proof that $\Sigma \cup \{\neg\varphi\} \vdash \bot$ also proves that $\varphi$ is true under the premises $\Sigma$. The use of this fact forms the basis of a proof technique called proof by contradiction, which mathematicians use extensively to establish the validity of a wide range of theorems. This applies only in a logic where the law of excluded middle $A\vee\neg A$ is accepted as an axiom.

Proof of contradiction is best executed under the circumstances that, under a set of consistent premises Σ, the proposition φ is impossible to prove, or the contradiction is easier to prove. A common example is the proof that √2 is irrational. Trying to prove this directly is extremely difficult, but assuming that it is rational creates a contradiction that is easy to prove (see "Proof using Reciprocals" under Square root of 2). Using proof by contradiction in other circumstances could be inefficient or not possible at all.

Using minimal logic, a logic with similar axioms to classical logic but without ex falso quodlibet and proof by contradiction, we can investigate the axiomatic strength and properties of various rules that treat contradiction by considering theorems of classical logic that are not theorems of minimal logic. Each of these extensions leads to an intermediate logic:

1. Double-negation elimination (DNE) is the strongest principle, axiomatized $\neg\neg A \implies A$, and when it is added to minimal logic yields classical logic.
2. Ex falso quodlibet (EFQ), axiomatized $\bot \implies A$, licenses many consequences of negations, but typically does not help to infer propositions that do not involve absurdity from consistent propositions that do. When added to minimal logic, EFQ yields intuitionistic logic. EFQ is equivalent to ex contradiction quodlibet, axiomatized $A \land \neg A \implies B$, over minimal logic.
3. Peirce's rule (PR) is an axiom $((A \implies B) \implies A) \implies A$ that captures proof by contradiction without explicitly referring to absurdity. Minimal logic + PR + EFQ yields classical logic.
4. The Gödel-Dummett (GD) axiom $A \implies B \vee B \implies A$, whose most simple reading is that there is a linear order on truth values. Minimal logic + GD yields Gödel-Dummett logic. Peirce's rule entails but is not entailed by GD over minimal logic.
5. Law of the excluded middle (LEM), axiomatised $A \vee \neg A$, is the most often cited formulation of the principle of bivalence, but in the absence of EFQ it does not yield full classical logic. Minimal logic + LEM + EFQ yields classical logic. PR entails but is not entailed by LEM in minimal logic. If the formula B in Peirce's rule is restricted to absurdity, giving the axiom schema $(\neg A \implies A) \implies A$, the scheme is equivalent to LEM over minimal logic.
6. Weak law of the excluded middle (WLEM) is axiomatised $\neg A \vee \neg\neg A$ and yields a system where disjunction behaves more like in classical logic than intuitionistic logic, i.e. the disjunction and existence properties don't hold, but where use of non-intuitionistic reasoning is marked by occurrences of double-negation in the conclusion. LEM entails but is not entailed by WLEM in minimal logic. WLEM is equivalent to the instance of De Morgan's law that distributes negation over conjunction: $\neg(A \land B) \iff (\neg A) \vee (\neg B)$.

=== Symbolic representation ===
In mathematics, the symbol used to represent a contradiction within a proof varies. Some symbols that may be used to represent a contradiction include ↯, Opq, $\Rightarrow \Leftarrow$, ⊥, $\leftrightarrow \ \!\!\!\!\!\!\!$/ , and ※; in any symbolism, a contradiction may be substituted for the truth value "false", as symbolized, for instance, by "0" (as is common in Boolean algebra). It is not uncommon to see Q.E.D., or some of its variants, immediately after a contradiction symbol. In fact, this often occurs in a proof by contradiction to indicate that the original assumption was proved false—and hence that its negation must be true.

=== The notion of contradiction in an axiomatic system and a proof of its consistency ===
In general, a consistency proof requires the following two things:

1. An axiomatic system
2. A demonstration that it is not the case that both the formula p and its negation ~p can be derived in the system.

But by whatever method one goes about it, all consistency proofs would seem to necessitate the primitive notion of contradiction. Moreover, it seems as if this notion would simultaneously have to be "outside" the formal system in the definition of tautology.

When Emil Post, in his 1921 "Introduction to a General Theory of Elementary Propositions", extended his proof of the consistency of the propositional calculus (i.e. the logic) beyond that of Principia Mathematica (PM), he observed that with respect to a generalized set of postulates (i.e. axioms), he would no longer be able to automatically invoke the notion of "contradiction"—such a notion might not be contained in the postulates:

The prime requisite of a set of postulates is that it be consistent. Since the ordinary notion of consistency involves that of contradiction, which again involves negation, and since this function does not appear in general as a primitive in [the generalized set of postulates] a new definition must be given.

Post's solution to the problem is described in the demonstration "An Example of a Successful Absolute Proof of Consistency", offered by Ernest Nagel and James R. Newman in their 1958 Gödel's Proof. They too observed a problem with respect to the notion of "contradiction" with its usual "truth values" of "truth" and "falsity". They observed that:

The property of being a tautology has been defined in notions of truth and falsity. Yet these notions obviously involve a reference to something outside the formula calculus. Therefore, the procedure mentioned in the text in effect offers an interpretation of the calculus, by supplying a model for the system. This being so, the authors have not done what they promised, namely, "to define a property of formulas in terms of purely structural features of the formulas themselves". [Indeed] ... proofs of consistency which are based on models, and which argue from the truth of axioms to their consistency, merely shift the problem.

Given some "primitive formulas" such as PM's primitives S_{1} V S_{2} [inclusive OR] and ~S (negation), one is forced to define the axioms in terms of these primitive notions. In a thorough manner, Post demonstrates in PM, and defines (as do Nagel and Newman, see below) that the property of tautologous – as yet to be defined – is "inherited": if one begins with a set of tautologous axioms (postulates) and a deduction system that contains substitution and modus ponens, then a consistent system will yield only tautologous formulas.

On the topic of the definition of tautologous, Nagel and Newman create two mutually exclusive and exhaustive classes K_{1} and K_{2}, into which fall (the outcome of) the axioms when their variables (e.g. S_{1} and S_{2} are assigned from these classes). This also applies to the primitive formulas. For example: "A formula having the form S_{1} V S_{2} is placed into class K_{2}, if both S_{1} and S_{2} are in K_{2}; otherwise it is placed in K_{1}", and "A formula having the form ~S is placed in K_{2}, if S is in K_{1}; otherwise it is placed in K_{1}".

Hence Nagel and Newman can now define the notion of tautologous: "a formula is a tautology if and only if it falls in the class K_{1}, no matter in which of the two classes its elements are placed". This way, the property of "being tautologous" is described—without reference to a model or an interpretation.

For example, given a formula such as ~S_{1} V S_{2} and an assignment of K_{1} to S_{1} and K_{2} to S_{2} one can evaluate the formula and place its outcome in one or the other of the classes. The assignment of K_{1} to S_{1} places ~S_{1} in K_{2}, and now we can see that our assignment causes the formula to fall into class K_{2}. Thus by definition our formula is not a tautology.

Post observed that, if the system were inconsistent, a deduction in it (that is, the last formula in a sequence of formulas derived from the tautologies) could ultimately yield S itself. As an assignment to variable S can come from either class K_{1} or K_{2}, the deduction violates the inheritance characteristic of tautology (i.e., the derivation must yield an evaluation of a formula that will fall into class K_{1}). From this, Post was able to derive the following definition of inconsistency—without the use of the notion of contradiction:

Definition. A system will be said to be inconsistent if it yields the assertion of the unmodified variable p [S in the Newman and Nagel examples].

In other words, the notion of "contradiction" can be dispensed when constructing a proof of consistency; what replaces it is the notion of "mutually exclusive and exhaustive" classes. An axiomatic system need not include the notion of "contradiction".

== Philosophy ==
Adherents of the epistemological theory of coherentism typically claim that as a necessary condition of the justification of a belief, that belief must form a part of a logically non-contradictory system of beliefs. Some dialetheists, including Graham Priest, have argued that coherence may not require consistency.

=== Pragmatic contradictions ===
A pragmatic contradiction occurs when the very statement of the argument contradicts the claims it purports. An inconsistency arises, in this case, because the act of utterance, rather than the content of what is said, undermines its conclusion.

=== Dialectical materialism ===
In dialectical materialism: Contradiction—as derived from Hegelianism—usually refers to an opposition inherently existing within one realm, one unified force or object. This contradiction, as opposed to metaphysical thinking, is not an objectively impossible thing, because these contradicting forces exist in objective reality, not cancelling each other out, but actually defining each other's existence. According to Marxist theory, such a contradiction can be found, for example, in the fact that:

1. enormous wealth and productive powers coexist alongside:
2. extreme poverty and misery;
3. the existence of (a) being contrary to the existence of (b)

Hegelian and Marxist theories stipulate that the dialectic nature of history will lead to the sublation, or synthesis, of its contradictions. Marx therefore postulated that history would logically make capitalism evolve into a socialist society where the means of production would equally serve the working and producing class of society, thus resolving the prior contradiction between (a) and (b).

== Outside formal logic ==
Colloquial usage can label actions or statements as contradicting each other when due (or perceived as due) to presuppositions which are contradictory in the logical sense.

Proof by contradiction is used in mathematics to construct proofs.

== China's contradictions ==
The term “矛盾” (contradiction) originates from an anecdote found in the “Nan I” chapter of Han Feizi. It tells of a man from State of Chu who was selling both a spear that could pierce any shield and a shield that could withstand any spear. When a customer asked what would happen if the spear were used against the shield, the man was unable to respond. If the spear pierced the shield, then the claim that the shield could withstand any spear would be false; if it did not, then the claim that the spear could pierce any shield would be false. Thus, whichever claim is accepted, the seller’s assertions are logically inconsistent.

The expression “矛盾” was later employed by Han Fei as part of a parable intended to criticize Confucianism—particularly its idealization of sage rulers such as Yao and Shun. Confucian thought holds that Yao, as a virtuous ruler, ceded the throne to Shun through abdication because Shun corrected wrongdoing and performed exemplary deeds for the benefit of the people.

However, according to Han Fei, if Yao had truly been an ideal ruler who governed the people well, there would have been no need for Shun to “correct wrongdoing” or improve governance in the first place. Conversely, if Shun’s virtuous reforms were indeed necessary, this would imply that Yao’s rule had been deficient. Therefore, the claim that both rulers were equally perfect and presided over ideal governance is logically inconsistent. Han Fei thus invoked the metaphor of “contradiction” to criticize Confucian doctrine and to assert the validity of his own Legalist philosophy, which emphasizes rule by law rather than moral virtue.

== See also ==
- "Argument Clinic" – Monty Python sketch, in which one of the two disputants repeatedly uses only contradictions in his argument
- Auto-antonym – Word that has two opposing meanings
- Contrary (logic) – Type of logic diagram
- Contronym – Word that has two opposing meanings
- Dialetheism – View that there are statements that are both true and false
- Double standard – Inconsistent application of principles
- Doublethink – Concept in Nineteen Eighty-Four of accepting two contradictory statements
- Graham's hierarchy of disagreement
- Irony – Literary and rhetorical device or general attitude towards life
- Law of noncontradiction – Logic theorem
- On Contradiction – 1937 essay by Mao Zedong
- Oxymoron – Figure of speech
- Paraconsistent logic – Type of formal logic
- Paradox – Logically self-contradictory statement
- Tautology – In logic, a statement which is always true
- TRIZ – Problem-solving tools

== Bibliography ==
- Józef Maria Bocheński 1960 Précis of Mathematical Logic, translated from the French and German editions by Otto Bird, D. Reidel, Dordrecht, South Holland.
- Jean van Heijenoort 1967 From Frege to Gödel: A Source Book in Mathematical Logic 1879-1931, Harvard University Press, Cambridge, MA, ISBN 0-674-32449-8 (pbk.)
- Ernest Nagel and James R. Newman 1958 Gödel's Proof, New York University Press, Card Catalog Number: 58-5610.
