= Non-classical logic =

Formal systems of logic that significantly differ from standard logical systems

Non-classical logics (sometimes alternative logics) are formal systems that differ from standard logical systems such as propositional and predicate logic. There are several ways in which this may be the case, including by way of extensions, deviations, and variations. The aim of these departures is to make it possible to construct different methods of achieving logical consequence such as paraconsistency or multi-valued conclusions.

Philosophical logic is generally understood to focus on non-classical logics, although the term has other meanings as well. In addition, some parts of theoretical computer science can be thought of as using non-classical reasoning, although this varies according to the subject area. The basic boolean functions (e.g. AND, OR, NOT, etc) used in various areas of computer science are obviously classical in nature, given that they can be fully described by classical truth tables. However, in contrast, some computerized proof methods may not use classical logic, and artificial intelligence systems may used inexact reasoning methods such as fuzzy logic.

== Examples of non-classical logics ==
There are many kinds of non-classical logic, which include:

- Computability logic is a semantically constructed formal theory of computability.
- Dialectical logic is the system of laws of thought, developed within the Hegelian and Marxist traditions, which seeks to supplement or replace the laws of formal logic. The precise nature of the relation between dialectical and formal logic was hotly debated within the Soviet Union and China.
- Dynamic semantics interprets formulas as update functions to the information state of the person who accepts the statements.
- Many-valued logic rejects bivalence, allowing for truth values other than true and false. The most popular forms are three-valued logic, as initially developed by Jan Łukasiewicz, and infinitely-valued logics such as fuzzy logic, which permit any real number between 0 and 1 as a truth value.
- Intuitionistic logic rejects the law of the excluded middle, double negation elimination, and part of De Morgan's laws;
- Linear logic rejects idempotency of entailment as well;
- Paraconsistent logic (e.g., relevance logic) rejects the principle of explosion, and has a close relation to dialetheism;
- Quantum logic
- Relevance logic, linear logic, and non-monotonic logic reject monotonicity of entailment;
- Non-reflexive logic (also known as "Schrödinger logics") rejects or restricts the law of identity;

== Classification of non-classical logics according to specific authors ==
In Deviant Logic (1974) Susan Haack divided non-classical logics into deviant, quasi-deviant, and extended logics. The proposed classification is non-exclusive; a logic may be both a deviation and an extension of classical logic. A few other authors have adopted the main distinction between deviation and extension in non-classical logics. John P. Burgess uses a similar classification but calls the two main classes anti-classical and extra-classical. Although some systems of classification for non-classical logic have been proposed, such as those of Haack and Burgess as described above for example, many people who study non-classical logic ignore these classification systems. As such, none of the classification systems in this section should be treated as standard.

In an extension, new and different logical constants are added, for instance the "$\Box$" in modal logic, which stands for "necessarily". In extensions of a logic,

- the set of well-formed formulas generated is a proper superset of the set of well-formed formulas generated by classical logic.
- the set of theorems generated is a proper superset of the set of theorems generated by classical logic, but only in that the novel theorems generated by the extended logic are only a result of novel well-formed formulas.

(See also Conservative extension.)

In a deviation, the usual logical constants are used, but are given a different meaning than usual. Only a subset of the theorems from the classical logic hold. A typical example is intuitionistic logic, where the law of excluded middle does not hold.

Additionally, one can identify a variations (or variants), where the content of the system remains the same, while the notation may change substantially. For instance many-sorted predicate logic is considered a just variation of predicate logic.

This classification ignores however semantic equivalences. For instance, Gödel showed that all theorems from intuitionistic logic have an equivalent theorem in the classical modal logic S4. The result has been generalized to superintuitionistic logics and extensions of S4.

The theory of abstract algebraic logic has also provided means to classify logics, with most results having been obtained for propositional logics. The current algebraic hierarchy of propositional logics has five levels, defined in terms of properties of their Leibniz operator: protoalgebraic, (finitely) equivalential, and (finitely) algebraizable.

== See also ==
- Logic in Eastern philosophy
  - Logic in China
  - Logic in India
