= Schrödinger logic =

Schrödinger logics are a kind of non-classical logic in which the law of identity is restricted.

These logics are motivated by the consideration that in quantum mechanics, elementary particles may be indistinguishable, even in principle, on the basis of any measurement. This in turn suggests that such particles cannot be considered as self-identical objects in the way that such things are usually treated within formal logic and set theory.

Schrödinger logics are many-sorted logics in which the expression x = y is not a well-formed formula in general. A formal semantics can be provided using the concept of a quasi-set. Schrödinger logics were introduced by da Costa and Krause.

Schrödinger logic is not related to quantum logic, which is a propositional logic that rejects the distributivity laws of classical logic.
