= William of Soissons =

Ancient French logician

William of Soissons (French: Guillaume de Soissons) was a French logician who lived in Paris in the 12th century. He belonged to a school of logicians called the Parvipontians.

== William of Soissons fundamental logical problem and solution ==
William of Soissons seems to have been the first one to answer the question, "Why is a contradiction not accepted in logic reasoning?" by the principle of explosion. Exposing a contradiction was already in the ancient days of Plato a way of showing that some reasoning was wrong, but there was no explicit argument as to why contradictions were incorrect. William of Soissons gave a proof in which he showed that from a contradiction any assertion can be inferred as true. In example from: It is raining (P) and it is not raining (¬P) you may infer that there are trees on the moon (or whatever else)(E). In symbolic language: P & ¬P → E.

If a contradiction makes anything true then it makes it impossible to say anything meaningful: whatever you say, its contradiction is also true.

== C. I. Lewis's reconstruction of his proof ==
William's contemporaries compared his proof with a siege engine (12th century). Clarence Irving Lewis formalized this proof as follows:

Proof

- V : or
- & : and
- → : inference
- P : proposition
- ¬ P : denial of P
- P &¬ P : contradiction.
- E : any possible assertion (Explosion).

(1) P &¬ P → P         (If P and ¬ P are both true then P is true)
(2) P → P∨E            (If P is true then P or E is true)
(3) P &¬ P → P∨E       (If P and ¬ P are both true then P or E are true (from (2))
(4) P &¬ P → ¬P        (If P and ¬ P are both true then ¬P is true)
(5) P &¬ P → (P∨E) &¬P (If P and ¬ P are both true then (P∨E) is true (from (3)) and ¬P is true (from (4)))
(6) (P∨E) &¬P → E      (If (P∨E) is true and ¬P is true then E is true)
(7) P &¬ P → E         (From (5) and (6) one after the other follows (7))

== Acceptance and criticism in later ages ==
In the 15th century this proof was rejected by a school in Cologne. They didn't accept step (6). In 19th-century classical logic, the Principle of Explosion was widely accepted as self-evident, e.g. by logicians like George Boole and Gottlob Frege, though the formalization of the Soissons proof by Lewis provided additional grounding for the Principle of Explosion.
