= Peirce's law =

Axiom used in logic and philosophy

In logic, Peirce's law is named after the philosopher and logician Charles Sanders Peirce. It was taken as an axiom in his first axiomatisation of propositional logic. It can be thought of as the law of excluded middle written in a form that involves only one sort of connective, namely implication.

In propositional calculus, Peirce's law says that ((P→Q)→P)→P. Written out, this means that P must be true if there is a proposition Q such that the truth of P follows from the truth of "if P then Q".

Peirce's law does not hold in intuitionistic logic or intermediate logics and cannot be deduced from the deduction theorem alone.

Under the Curry–Howard isomorphism, Peirce's law is the type of continuation operators, e.g. call/cc in Scheme.

== History ==
Here is Peirce's own statement of the law:

A fifth icon is required for the principle of excluded middle and other propositions connected with it. One of the simplest formulae of this kind is:

{(x ⤙ y) ⤙ x} ⤙ x.

This is hardly axiomatical. That it is true appears as follows. It can only be false by the final consequent x being false while its antecedent (x ⤙ y) ⤙ x is true. If this is true, either its consequent, x, is true, when the whole formula would be true, or its antecedent x ⤙ y is false. But in the last case the antecedent of x ⤙ y, that is x, must be true. (Peirce, the Collected Papers 3.384).

Peirce goes on to point out an immediate application of the law:

From the formula just given, we at once get:

{(x ⤙ y) ⤙ a} ⤙ x,

where the a is used in such a sense that (x ⤙ y) ⤙ a means that from (x ⤙ y) every proposition follows. With that understanding, the formula states the principle of excluded middle, that from the falsity of the denial of x follows the truth of x. (Peirce, the Collected Papers 3.384).

Warning: As explained in the text, "a" here does not denote a propositional atom, but something like the quantified propositional formula $\forall p\,p$. The formula ((x → y) → a) → x would not be a tautology if a were interpreted as an atom.

== Relations between principles ==
In intuitionistic logic, if $P$ is proven or rejected, or if $Q$ is proven valid, then Peirce's law for the two propositions holds. But the law's special case when $Q$ is rejected, called consequentia mirabilis, is equivalent to excluded middle already over minimal logic. This also means that Peirce's law entails classical logic over intuitionistic logic. This is shown below.

Firstly, from $P\to Q$ follows the equivalence $P\leftrightarrow(P\land Q)$, and so $(P\to Q)\to P$ is equivalent to $(P\to Q)\to (P\land Q)$. With this, one can also establish Peirce's law by establishing the equivalent form $((P\to Q)\to(P\land Q))\to P$. Considering the case $Q=\bot$ likewise also shows how double-negation elimination $\neg \neg P\to P$ implies consequentia mirabilis, and this direction even only uses minimal logic. Now in intuitionistic logic, explosion can be used for $\bot\to(P\land\bot)$, and so here consequentia mirabilis also implies double-negation elimination.

As the double-negated excluded middle is always already valid even in minimal logic, it thus further also implies excluded middle, over intuitionistic logic. In the other direction, one can intuitionistically also show that excluded middle implies the full Peirce's law directly. To this end, note that using the principle of explosion, excluded middle may be expressed as $P\lor (P\to Q)$. In words, this may be expressed as: "Every proposition $P$ either holds or implies any other proposition." Now to prove the law, note that $(P\lor R)\to((R\to P)\to P)$ is derivable from just implication introduction on the one hand and modus ponens on the other. Finally, in place of $R$ consider $P\to Q$.

Another proof of the law in classical logic proceeds by passing through the classically valid reverse disjunctive syllogism twice: First note that $\neg\neg P$ is implied by $(\neg\neg P \land \neg Q) \lor P$, which is intuitionistically equivalent to $\neg(\neg P \lor Q) \lor P$. Now explosion entails that $\neg A \lor B$ implies $A \to B$, and using excluded middle for $A$ here entails that these two are in fact equivalent. Taken together, this means that in classical logic $P$ is equivalent to $(P \to Q)\to P$.

Intuitionistically, not even the constraint $\neg Q\to P$ always implies Pierce's law for two propositions. Postulating the latter to be valid in its propositional form results in Smetanich's intermediate logic.

== Using Peirce's law with the deduction theorem ==
Peirce's law allows one to enhance the technique of using the deduction theorem to prove theorems. Suppose one is given a set of premises Γ and one wants to deduce a proposition Z from them. With Peirce's law, one can add (at no cost) additional premises of the form Z→P to Γ. For example, suppose we are given P→Z and (P→Q)→Z and we wish to deduce Z so that we can use the deduction theorem to conclude that (P→Z)→(((P→Q)→Z)→Z) is a theorem. Then we can add another premise Z→Q. From that and P→Z, we get P→Q. Then we apply modus ponens with (P→Q)→Z as the major premise to get Z. Applying the deduction theorem, we get that (Z→Q)→Z follows from the original premises. Then we use Peirce's law in the form ((Z→Q)→Z)→Z and modus ponens to derive Z from the original premises. Then we can finish off proving the theorem as we originally intended.

- P→Z
1. hypothesis
  - (P→Q)→Z
2. hypothesis
    - Z→Q
3. hypothesis
      - P
4. hypothesis
      - Z
5. modus ponens using steps 4 and 1
      - Q
6. modus ponens using steps 5 and 3
    - P→Q
7. deduction from 4 to 6
    - Z
8. modus ponens using steps 7 and 2
  - (Z→Q)→Z
9. deduction from 3 to 8
  - ((Z→Q)→Z)→Z
10. Peirce's law
  - Z
11. modus ponens using steps 9 and 10
- ((P→Q)→Z)→Z
12. deduction from 2 to 11

(P→Z)→(((P→Q)→Z)→Z)

13. deduction from 1 to 12 QED

== Completeness of the implicational propositional calculus ==
One reason that Peirce's law is important is that it can substitute for the law of excluded middle in the logic which only uses implication. The sentences which can be deduced from the axiom schemas:

- P→(Q→P)
- (P→(Q→R))→((P→Q)→(P→R))
- ((P→Q)→P)→P
- from P and P→Q infer Q

(where P,Q,R contain only "→" as a connective) are all the tautologies which use only "→" as a connective.

== Failure in non-classical models of intuitionistic logic ==
Since Peirce's law implies the law of the excluded middle, it must always fail in non-classical intuitionistic logics. A simple explicit counterexample is that of Gödel many valued logics, which are a fuzzy logic where truth values are real numbers between 0 and 1, with material implication defined by:

$$\begin{align}
u \mathrel{\xrightarrow[G]{}} v &= \begin{cases}
1, & \text{if }u \leq v \\
v, & \text{if }u > v
\end{cases}
\end{align}$$

and where Peirce's law as a formula can be simplified to:

$$\begin{align}
((u \mathrel{\xrightarrow[G]{}} v) \mathrel{\xrightarrow[G]{}} u) \mathrel{\xrightarrow[G]{}} u &= \begin{cases}
1, & \text{if }u \leq v \\
u, & \text{if }u > v
\end{cases}
\end{align}$$

where it always being true would be equivalent to the statement that u > v implies u = 1, which is true only if 0 and 1 are the only allowed values. At the same time however, the expression cannot ever be equal to the bottom truth value of the logic and its double negation is always true.

== See also ==
- Charles Sanders Peirce bibliography
