= Deviant logic =

Class of non-classical logics

Deviant logic is a type of logic incompatible with classical logic. Philosopher Susan Haack uses the term deviant logic to describe certain non-classical systems of logic. In these logics:

- the set of well-formed formulas generated equals the set of well-formed formulas generated by classical logic.
- the set of theorems generated is different from the set of theorems generated by classical logic.

The set of theorems of a deviant logic can differ in any possible way from classical logic's set of theorems: as a proper subset, superset, or fully exclusive set. A notable example of this is the trivalent logic developed by Polish logician and mathematician Jan Łukasiewicz. Under this system, any theorem necessarily dependent on classical logic's principle of bivalence would fail to be valid. The term deviant logic first appears in Chapter 6 of Willard Van Orman Quine's Philosophy of Logic, New Jersey: Prentice Hall (1970), which is cited by Haack on p. 15 of her book.

== Quasi-deviant and extended logics ==
Haack also described what she calls a quasi-deviant logic. These logics are different from pure deviant logics in that:

- the set of well-formed formulas generated is a proper superset of the set of well-formed formulas generated by classical logic.
- the set of theorems generated is a proper superset of the set of theorems generated by classical logic, both in that the quasi-deviant logic generates novel theorems using well-formed formulas held in common with classical logic, as well as novel theorems using novel well-formed formulas.

Finally, Haack defined a class of merely extended logics. In these,

- the set of well-formed formulas generated is a proper superset of the set of well-formed formulas generated by classical logic.
- the set of theorems generated is a proper superset of the set of theorems generated by classical logic, but only in that the novel theorems generated by the extended logic are only a result of novel well-formed formulas.

Some systems of modal logic meet this definition. In such systems, any novel theorem would not parse in classical logic due to modal operators. While deviant and quasi-deviant logics are typically proposed as rivals to classical logic, the impetus behind extended logics is normally only to provide a supplement to it.

== Two decades later ==
Achille Varzi in his review of the 1996 edition of Haack's book writes that the survey did not stand well the test of time, particularly with the "extraordinary proliferation of nonclassical logics in the past two decades—paraconsistent logics, linear logics, substructural logics, nonmonotonic logics, innumerable other logics for AI and computer science." He also finds that Haack's account of vagueness "is now seriously defective." He concedes however that "as a defense of a philosophical position, Deviant Logic retains its significance."
