= Law of noncontradiction =

Logic theorem

In logic, the law of noncontradiction (LNC; also known as the law of contradiction, principle of non-contradiction (PNC), or the principle of contradiction) states that for any given proposition, the proposition and its negation cannot both be simultaneously true, e.g., the proposition "the house is white" and its negation "the house is not white" are mutually exclusive.

To express the fact that the law is tenseless and to avoid equivocation, sometimes the law is amended to say "contradictory propositions cannot both be true at the same time and in the same sense".

Formally, the law is expressed as the tautology ¬(p ∧ ¬p). One reason to have this law is the principle of explosion, which states that anything follows from a contradiction, resulting in trivialism. The law is employed in a reductio ad absurdum proof. Paraconsistent logics are those logics which deny explosion.

== History ==
Early in philosophy, it is hard to distinguish between different conceptions of the law of non-contradiction. One can interpret a logical law ontologically, e. g. to say nothing in reality is contradictory; one can interpret it psychologically, to say one cannot believe in a contradiction, and one can interpret it more strictly logically, that contradictory propositions cannot be true.

=== East ===
==== Indian philosophy ====
The Buddhist Tripitaka attributes to Nigaṇṭha Nātaputta, who lived in the 6th century BCE, the implicit formulation of the law of noncontradiction, "'See how upright, honest and sincere Citta, the householder, is'; and, a little later, he also says: 'See how Citta, the householder, is not upright, honest or sincere.' To this, Citta replies: 'if your former statement is true, your latter statement is false and if your latter statement is true, your former statement is false.'" Early explicit formulations of the law of noncontradiction were ontic, with later 2nd century Buddhist philosopher Nagarjuna stating "when something is a single thing, it cannot be both existent and non-existent", similar to Aristotle's own ontic formulation that "a thing cannot at the same time be and not be".

It is found in ancient Indian logic as a meta-rule in the Shrauta Sutras, the grammar of Pāṇini, and the Brahma Sutras attributed to Vyasa. It was later elaborated on by medieval commentators such as Madhvacharya.

=== West ===
==== Pre-Socratics ====
According to both Plato and Aristotle, Heraclitus was said to have denied the law of non-contradiction, stating "one cannot step into the same river twice". So was the sophist Protagoras whose most famous saying is: "Man is the measure of all things: of things which are, that they are, and of things which are not, that they are not".

Parmenides seemed to deploy an ontological version of the law of non-contradiction in saying what is not cannot be, and thereby to deny the void, change, and motion.

==== Socrates ====
The earlier dialogues of Plato (424–348 BCE), relating the discourses of Socrates, raised the use of reductio arguments to a formal dialectical method (elenchus), also called the Socratic method.

==== Plato ====
Plato's version of the law of non-contradiction states that "The same thing clearly cannot act or be acted upon in the same part or in relation to the same thing at the same time, in contrary ways" (The Republic (436b)). In this, Plato carefully phrases three axiomatic restrictions on action or reaction: in the same part, in the same relation, at the same time. The effect is to momentarily create a frozen, timeless state, somewhat like figures frozen in action on the frieze of the Parthenon.

This way, he accomplishes two essential goals for his philosophy. First, he logically separates the Platonic world of constant change from the formally knowable world of momentarily fixed physical objects. Second, he provides the conditions for the dialectic method to be used in finding definitions, as for example in the Sophist. So Plato's law of non-contradiction is the empirically derived necessary starting point for all else he has to say.

In contrast, Aristotle reverses Plato's order of derivation. Rather than starting with experience, Aristotle begins a priori with the law of non-contradiction as the fundamental axiom of an analytic philosophical system. This axiom then necessitates the fixed, realist model. Aristotle starts with much stronger logical foundations than Plato's single decisive action in response to conflicting demands from the three parts of the soul.

==== Aristotle ====
Aristotle calls the law of non-contradiction "the most certain of all principles" in Metaphysics Book IV. Ever since, the law has been high orthodoxy.

Aristotle gives three different versions.

- Ontological: "It is impossible that the same thing belong and not belong to the same thing at the same time and in the same respect." (1005b19-20)
- Psychological: "No one can believe that the same thing can (at the same time) be and not be." (1005b23–24)
- Logical (aka the medieval Lex Contradictoriarum): "The most certain of all basic principles is that contradictory propositions are not true simultaneously." (1011b13-14)

Aristotle attempts several proofs of this law. He first argues that every expression has a single meaning (otherwise we could not communicate with one another). This rules out the possibility that by "to be a man", "not to be a man" is meant. But "man" means "two-footed animal" (for example), and so if anything is a man, it is necessary (by virtue of the meaning of "man") that it must be a two-footed animal, and so it is impossible at the same time for it not to be a two-footed animal. Thus "it is not possible to say truly at the same time that the same thing is and is not a man" (Metaphysics 1006b 35). Another argument is that anyone who believes something cannot believe its contradiction (1008b).

However, note for Aristotle this seems a principle of metaphysics rather than one of logic. Aristotle notes his logic would still work even if the law of non contradiction were false. This seems to mean Aristotle's logic denies explosion and so is paraconsistent.

==== Thomas Aquinas ====
Thomas Aquinas argued that the principle of non-contradiction is essential to the reasoning of human beings ("One cannot reasonably hold two mutually exclusive beliefs at the same time") (Met. IV, lect. 6). He argued that human reasoning without the principle of non-contradiction is utterly impossible because reason itself can't function with two contradictory ideas. Aquinas argued that this is the same both for moral arguments as well as theological arguments and even machinery ("the parts must work together, the machine can't work if two parts are incompatible").

Duns Scotus (Quaest. sup. Met. IV, Q. 3) and writer Francisco Suárez (Disp. Met. III, § 3) also follow the Aristotelian view about the law of non-contradiction.

==== Leibniz and Kant ====
Leibniz and Kant both used the law of non-contradiction to define the difference between analytic and synthetic propositions. For Leibniz, analytic statements follow from the law of non-contradiction, and synthetic ones from the principle of sufficient reason.

==== Russell ====
The principle was stated as a theorem of propositional logic by Russell and Whitehead in Principia Mathematica as:

$$\mathbf{*3\cdot24}. \ \  \vdash. \thicksim(p.\thicksim p)$$

==== Dialetheism ====
Graham Priest advocates the view that under some conditions, some statements can be both true and false simultaneously, or may be true and false at different times. Dialetheism arises from formal logical paradoxes, such as the liar's paradox and Russell's paradox, even though it is not the only solution to them. Prior to Priest, Nicholas of Cusa and Hegel were both dialetheists.

== Alleged impossibility of its proof or denial ==
The law of non-contradiction is alleged to be neither verifiable nor falsifiable, on the ground that any proof or disproof must use the law itself prior to reaching the conclusion. In other words, in order to verify or falsify such a principle of logic, one must resort to using it in the verification, an act that is argued to be self-defeating (rather like trying to bite one's own teeth). Aristotle said trying to prove the law of non-contradiction shows "want of education".

Since the early 20th century, certain logicians have proposed logics that deny the law. Logics known as "paraconsistent" are inconsistency-tolerant logics in that there, from P together with ¬P, it does not imply that any proposition follows. Paraconsistent logics deny explosion. Nevertheless, not all paraconsistent logics deny the law of non-contradiction and some such logics even prove it.

Some, such as David Lewis, have objected to paraconsistent logic on the ground that it is simply impossible for a statement and its negation to be jointly true. A related objection is that "negation" in paraconsistent logic is not really negation; it is merely a subcontrary-forming operator. Those who (like the dialetheists) claim that the Law of Non-Contradiction can be violated are in fact using a different definition of negation, and therefore talking about something else other than the Law of Non-Contradiction which is based on a particular definition of negation and therefore cannot be violated.

== In popular culture ==
The Fargo episode "The Law of Non-Contradiction", which takes its name from the law, was noted for its several elements relating to the law of non-contradiction, as the episode's main character faces several paradoxes. For example, she is still the acting chief of police while having been demoted from the position, and tries to investigate a man that both was and was not named Ennis Stussy, and who both was and was not her stepfather.

== Bibliography ==
- Aristotle (1998). Lawson-Tancred, H. (ed.). Aristotle's Metaphysics. Penguin.
- Béziau, J. Y. (2000). What is paraconsistent logic. Frontiers of paraconsistent logic, 95-111.
- Lewis, David (1982), "Logic for equivocators", reprinted in Papers in Philosophical Logic, Cambridge University Press (1997), p. 97-110.
- Łukasiewicz, Jan (1971) [1910 in Polish], "On the Principle of Contradiction in Aristotle", Review of Metaphysics, 24: 485–509.
- Slater, B. H. (1995). Paraconsistent logics?. Journal of Philosophical logic, 24(4), 451-454.
