= Principle of explosion =

Theorem in formal logic

In classical logic, intuitionistic logic, and similar logical systems, the principle of explosion (Note: Latin: ex falso [sequitur] quodlibet, 'from falsehood, anything [follows]'; or ex contradictione [sequitur] quodlibet, 'from contradiction, anything [follows]'.) (Note: Also known as the principle of Pseudo-Scotus (falsely attributed to Duns Scotus).) is the theorem according to which any statement can be proven from a contradiction. That is, from a contradiction, any proposition (including its negation) can be inferred; this is known as deductive explosion.

The proof of this principle was first given by 12th-century French philosopher William of Soissons. Due to the principle of explosion, the existence of a contradiction (inconsistency) in a formal axiomatic system is disastrous; since any statement—true or not—can be proven, it trivializes the concepts of truth and falsity. Around the turn of the 20th century, the discovery of contradictions such as Russell's paradox at the foundations of mathematics thus threatened the entire structure of mathematics. Mathematicians such as Gottlob Frege, Ernst Zermelo, Abraham Fraenkel, and Thoralf Skolem put much effort into revising set theory to eliminate these contradictions, resulting in the modern Zermelo–Fraenkel set theory.

As a demonstration of the principle, consider two contradictory statements—"All lemons are yellow" and "Not all lemons are yellow"—and suppose that both are true. If that is the case, anything can be proven, e.g., the assertion that "unicorns exist", by using the following argument:

1. We know that "Not all lemons are yellow", as it has been assumed to be true.
2. We know that "All lemons are yellow", as it has been assumed to be true.
3. Therefore, the two-part statement "All lemons are yellow or unicorns exist" must also be true, since the first part of the statement ("All lemons are yellow") has already been assumed, and the use of "or" means that if even one part of the statement is true, the statement as a whole must be true as well.
4. However, since we also know that "Not all lemons are yellow" (as this has been assumed), the first part is false, and hence the second part must be true to ensure the two-part statement to be true, i.e., unicorns exist (this inference is known as the disjunctive syllogism).
5. The procedure may be repeated to prove that unicorns do not exist (hence proving an additional contradiction where unicorns do and do not exist), as well as any other well-formed formula. Thus, there is an explosion of provable statements.

In a different solution to the problems posed by the principle of explosion, some mathematicians have devised alternative theories of logic called paraconsistent logics, which allow some contradictory statements to be proven without affecting the truth value of (all) other statements.

== Symbolic representation ==
In symbolic logic, the principle of explosion can be expressed schematically in the following way:

$P, \lnot P \vdash Q$ For any statements P and Q, if P and not-P are both true, then it logically follows that Q is true.

== Proof ==
Below is the Lewis argument, a formal proof of the principle of explosion using symbolic logic.

Step	Proposition	Derivation
1	$P\land\neg P$	Premise (Note: Burgess2005 uses 2 and 3 as premises instead of this one)
2	$P$	Conjunction elimination (1)
3	$\neg P$	Conjunction elimination (1)
4	$P \lor Q$	Disjunction introduction (2)
5	$Q$	Disjunctive syllogism (4,3)

This proof was published by C. I. Lewis and is named after him, though versions of it were known to medieval logicians.

This is just the symbolic version of the informal argument given in the introduction, with $P$ standing for "All lemons are yellow" and $Q$ standing for "Unicorns exist". We start out by assuming that (1) all lemons are yellow and that (2) not all lemons are yellow. From the proposition that all lemons are yellow, we infer that (3) either all lemons are yellow or unicorns exist. But then from this and the fact that not all lemons are yellow, we infer that (4) unicorns exist by disjunctive syllogism.

=== Semantic argument ===
An alternate argument for the principle stems from model theory. A sentence $P$ is a semantic consequence of a set of sentences $\Gamma$ only if every model of $\Gamma$ is a model of $P$. However, there is no model of the contradictory set $(P \wedge \lnot P)$. A fortiori, there is no model of $(P \wedge \lnot P)$ that is not a model of $Q$. Thus, vacuously, every model of $(P \wedge \lnot P)$ is a model of $Q$. Thus $Q$ is a semantic consequence of $(P \wedge \lnot P)$.

== Paraconsistent logic ==
Paraconsistent logics have been developed that allow for subcontrary-forming operators. Model-theoretic paraconsistent logicians often deny the assumption that there can be no model of $\{\phi , \lnot \phi \}$ and devise semantical systems in which there are such models. Alternatively, they reject the idea that propositions can be classified as true or false. Proof-theoretic paraconsistent logics usually deny the validity of one of the steps necessary for deriving an explosion, typically including disjunctive syllogism, disjunction introduction, and reductio ad absurdum.

== Usage ==
The metamathematical value of the principle of explosion is that for any logical system where this principle holds, any derived theory which proves ⊥ (or an equivalent form, $\phi \land \lnot \phi$) is worthless because all its statements would become theorems, making it impossible to distinguish truth from falsehood. That is to say, the principle of explosion is an argument for the law of non-contradiction in classical logic, because without it all truth statements become meaningless.

Reduction in proof strength of logics without the principle of explosion is discussed in minimal logic.

== See also ==
- Consequentia mirabilis – Clavius' Law
- Dialetheism – belief in the existence of true contradictions
- Law of excluded middle – every proposition is true or false
- Law of noncontradiction – no proposition can be both true and not true
- Paraconsistent logic – a family of logics used to address contradictions
- Paradox of entailment – a seeming paradox derived from the principle of explosion
- Reductio ad absurdum – concluding that a proposition is false because it produces a contradiction
- Trivialism – the belief that all statements of the form "P and not-P" are true
