= Classical logic =

Class of formal logics

Classical logic (or standard logic) or Frege–Russell logic is the intensively studied and most widely used class of deductive logic. Classical logic has had much influence on analytic philosophy.

== Characteristics ==
Each logical system in this class shares characteristic properties:

1. Law of excluded middle and double negation elimination
2. Law of noncontradiction, and the principle of explosion
3. Monotonicity of entailment and idempotency of entailment
4. Commutativity of conjunction
5. De Morgan duality: every logical operator is dual to another

While not entailed by the preceding conditions, contemporary discussions of classical logic normally only include propositional and first-order logics. In other words, the overwhelming majority of time spent studying classical logic has been spent studying specifically propositional and first-order logic, as opposed to the other forms of classical logic.

Most semantics of classical logic are bivalent, meaning all of the possible denotations of propositions can be categorized as either true or false.

== History ==
Classical logic is a 19th and 20th-century innovation. The name does not refer to classical antiquity, which used the term logic of Aristotle. Classical logic was the reconciliation of Aristotle's logic, which dominated most of the last 2000 years, with the propositional Stoic logic. The two were sometimes seen as irreconcilable.

Leibniz's calculus ratiocinator can be seen as foreshadowing classical logic. Bernard Bolzano has the understanding of existential import found in classical logic and not in Aristotle. Though he never questioned Aristotle, George Boole's algebraic reformulation of logic, so-called Boolean logic, was a predecessor of modern mathematical logic and classical logic. William Stanley Jevons and John Venn, who also had the modern understanding of existential import, expanded Boole's system.

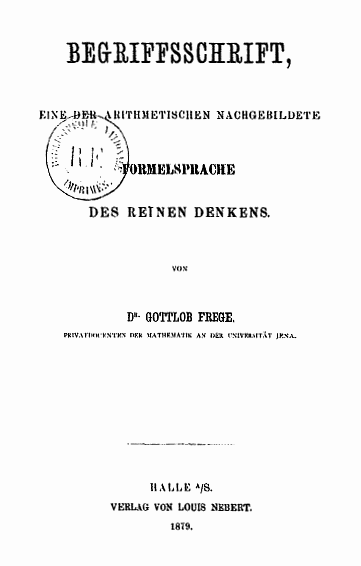
Begriffsschrift title page

The original first-order, classical logic is found in Gottlob Frege's Begriffsschrift. It has a wider application than Aristotle's logic and is capable of expressing Aristotle's logic as a special case. It explains the quantifiers in terms of mathematical functions. It was also the first logic capable of dealing with the problem of multiple generality, for which Aristotle's system was impotent. Frege, who is considered the founder of analytic philosophy, invented it to show all of mathematics was derivable from logic, and make arithmetic rigorous as David Hilbert had done for geometry, the doctrine is known as logicism in the foundations of mathematics. The notation Frege used never much caught on. Hugh MacColl published a variant of propositional logic two years prior.

The writings of Augustus De Morgan and Charles Sanders Peirce also pioneered classical logic with the logic of relations. Peirce influenced Giuseppe Peano and Ernst Schröder.

Classical logic reached fruition in Bertrand Russell and A. N. Whitehead's Principia Mathematica, and Ludwig Wittgenstein's Tractatus Logico Philosophicus. Russell and Whitehead were influenced by Peano (it uses his notation) and Frege and sought to show mathematics was derived from logic. Wittgenstein was influenced by Frege and Russell and initially considered the Tractatus to have solved all problems of philosophy.

Willard Van Orman Quine believed that a formal system that allows quantification over predicates (higher-order logic) didn't meet the requirements to be a logic, saying that it was "set theory in disguise".

Classical logic is the standard logic of mathematics. Many mathematical theorems rely on classical rules of inference such as disjunctive syllogism and the double negation elimination. The adjective "classical" in logic is not related to the use of the adjective "classical" in physics, which has another meaning. In logic, "classical" simply means "standard". Classical logic should also not be confused with term logic, also known as Aristotelian logic.

Jan Łukasiewicz pioneered non-classical logic.

== Generalized semantics ==
With the advent of algebraic logic, it became apparent that classical propositional calculus admits other semantics. In Boolean-valued semantics (for classical propositional logic), the truth values are the elements of an arbitrary Boolean algebra; "true" corresponds to the maximal element of the algebra, and "false" corresponds to the minimal element. Intermediate elements of the algebra correspond to truth values other than "true" and "false". The principle of bivalence holds only when the Boolean algebra is taken to be the two-element algebra, which has no intermediate elements.
