= Connexive logic =

Connexive logic is a class of non-classical logics designed to exclude the paradoxes of material implication. The characteristic that separates connexive logic from other non-classical logics is its acceptance of Aristotle's thesis, i.e. the formula,
$$\lnot ( \lnot p \rightarrow p )$$
as a logical truth. Aristotle's thesis asserts that no statement follows from its own denial. Stronger connexive logics also accept Boethius' thesis,
$$(p \rightarrow q) \rightarrow \lnot(p \rightarrow \lnot q)$$
which states that if a statement implies one thing, it does not imply its opposite.

Relevance logic is another logical theory that tries to avoid the paradoxes of material implication.

== Failure in classical logic ==
Adding Aristotle's thesis to classical logic leads to a contradiction, and therefore any logic employing it needs to give up one or more principles of classical logic. If p is true, then the thesis comes out as false, because it is logically equivalent to $\lnot p$.

| 1 | $\lnot ( \lnot p \rightarrow p )$ | |
| 2 | $\lnot ( \lnot\lnot p \lor p )$ | material implication |
| 3 | $\lnot ( p \lor p )$ | double negation elimination |
| 3 | $\lnot p$ | idempotency of disjunction |

== History ==
Connexive logic is arguably one of the oldest approaches to logic. Aristotle's thesis is named after Aristotle because he uses this principle in a passage in the Prior Analytics.

It is impossible that the same thing should be necessitated by the being and the not-being of the same thing. I mean, for example, that it is impossible that B should necessarily be great if A is white, and that B should necessarily be great if A is not white. For if B is not great A cannot be white. But if, when A is not white, it is necessary that B should be great, it necessarily results that if B is not great, B itself is great. But this is impossible. An. Pr. ii 4.57b3.

The sense of this passage is to perform a reductio ad absurdum proof on the claim that two formulas, (A → B) and (~A → B), can be true simultaneously. The proof is:

| 1 | (A → B) | hypothesis (reductio) |
| 2 | (~A → B) | hypothesis (reductio) |
| 3 | ~B | hypothesis |
| 4 | ~A | 1, 3, modus tollens |
| 5 | B | 2, 4, modus ponens |
| 6 | (~B → B) | 3, 5, conditional proof |

Aristotle then declares the last line to be impossible, completing the reductio. But if it is impossible, its denial, ~(~B → B), is a logical truth.

Aristotelian syllogisms (as opposed to Boolean syllogisms) appear to be based on connexive principles. For example, the contrariety of A and E statements, "All S are P," and "No S are P," follows by a reductio ad absurdum argument similar to the one given by Aristotle.

Later logicians, notably Chrysippus, are also thought to have endorsed connexive principles. By 100 BCE logicians had divided into four or five distinct schools concerning the correct understanding of conditional ("if...then...") statements. Sextus Empiricus described one school as follows:

And those who introduce the notion of connexion say that a conditional is sound when the contradictory of its consequent is incompatible with its antecedent.

The term "connexivism" is derived from this passage (as translated by Kneale and Kneale).

It is believed that Sextus was here describing the school of Chrysippus. That this school accepted Aristotle's thesis seems clear because the definition of the conditional,

- (p → q) := ~(p ° ~q), where ° indicates compatibility,

requires that Aristotle's thesis be a logical truth, provided we assume that every statement is compatible with itself, which seems fairly fundamental to the concept of compatibility.

The medieval philosopher Boethius also accepted connexive principles. In De Syllogismo Hypothetico, he argues that from, "If A, then if B then C," and "If B then not-C," we may infer "not-A," by modus tollens. However, this follows only if the two statements, "If B then C," and "If B then not-C," are considered incompatible.

Since Aristotelian logic was the standard logic studied until the 19th century, it could reasonably be claimed that connexive logic was the accepted school of thought among logicians for most of Western history. (Of course, logicians were not necessarily aware of belonging to the connexivist school.) However, in the 19th century Boolean syllogisms, and a propositional logic based on truth functions, became the standard. Since then, relatively few logicians have subscribed to connexivism. These few include Everett J. Nelson and P. F. Strawson.

== Connecting antecedent to consequent ==
The objection that is made to the truth-functional definition of conditionals is that there is no requirement that the consequent actually follow from the antecedent. So long as the antecedent is false or the consequent true, the conditional is considered to be true whether there is any relation between the antecedent and the consequent or not. Hence, as the philosopher Charles Sanders Peirce once remarked, you can cut up a newspaper, sentence by sentence, put all the sentences in a hat, and draw any two at random. It is guaranteed that either the first sentence will imply the second, or vice versa. But when we use the words "if" and "then" we generally mean to assert that there is some relation between the antecedent and the consequent. What is the nature of that relationship? Relevance (or relevant) logicians take the view that, in addition to saying that the consequent cannot be false while the antecedent is true, the antecedent must be "relevant" to the consequent. At least initially, this means that there must be at least some terms (or variables) that appear in both the antecedent and the consequent. Connexivists generally claim instead that there must be some "real connection" between the antecedent and the consequent, such as might be the result of real class inclusion relations. For example, the class relations, "All men are mortal," would provide a real connection that would warrant the conditional, "If Socrates is a man, then Socrates is mortal." However, more remote connections, for example "If she apologized to him, then he lied to me." (suggested by Bennett) still defy connexivist analysis.
