= Vacuous truth =

Conditional statement which is true because the antecedent cannot be satisfied

In mathematics and logic, a vacuous truth is a conditional or universal statement (specifically a universal statement that can be converted to a conditional statement) that is true because the antecedent cannot be satisfied. An example of such a statement is "if Tokyo is in Spain, then the Eiffel Tower is in Bolivia".

It is sometimes said that a statement is vacuously true because it does not really say anything. For example, the statement "all cell phones in the room are turned off" (alternatively said "for all x in this room, if x is a cellphone then x is turned off") will be true when no cell phones are present in the room. In this case, the statement "all cell phones in the room are turned on" would also be vacuously true. The conjunction of the two: "all cell phones in the room are turned on and all cell phones in the room are turned off", can only be true vacuously, and it implies "there are no cell phones in the room".

Vacuous statements are also used as a rhetorical device for creating verbal irony. A common example is the "Queen of England" retort; For example, "I'm a great swimmer". "If you're a great swimmer, then I'm the Queen of England", using a transparent false conclusion to imply the statement is vacuous and thus the premise is false.

== Definitions ==
These statements are considered vacuous truths because the fact that the antecedent is false prevents using the statement to infer anything about the truth value of the consequent. In essence, a conditional statement that is based on the material conditional, is true when the antecedent ("Tokyo is in Spain" in the example) is false regardless of whether the conclusion or consequent ("the Eiffel Tower is in Bolivia" in the example) is true or false because the material conditional is defined in that way.

Examples common to everyday speech include conditional phrases used as idioms of improbability like "when hell freezes over ..." and "when pigs can fly ...", indicating that not before the given (impossible) condition is met will the speaker accept some respective (typically false or absurd) proposition.

In pure mathematics, vacuously true statements are not generally of interest by themselves, but they frequently arise as the base case of proofs by mathematical induction. This notion has relevance in pure mathematics, as well as in any other field that uses classical logic.

Outside of mathematics, statements in the form of a vacuous truth, while logically valid, can nevertheless be misleading. Such statements make reasonable assertions about qualified objects which do not actually exist. For example, a child might truthfully tell their parent "I ate every vegetable on my plate", when there were no vegetables on the child's plate to begin with. In this case, the parent can believe that the child has actually eaten some vegetables, even though that is not true.

== Scope of the concept ==
A statement $S$ is "vacuously true" if it resembles a material conditional statement $P \Rightarrow Q$, where the antecedent $P$ is known to be false.

Vacuously true statements that can be reduced (with suitable transformations) to this basic form (material conditional) include the following universally quantified statements:

- $\forall x: P(x) \Rightarrow Q(x)$, where it is the case that $\forall x: \neg P(x)$.
- $\forall x \in A: Q(x)$, where the set $A$ is empty.
  - This logical form $\forall x \in A: Q(x)$ can be converted to the material conditional form in order to easily identify the antecedent. For the above example $S$ "all cell phones in the room are turned off", it can be formally written as $\forall x \in A: Q(x)$ where $A$ is the set of all cell phones in the room and $Q(x)$ is "$x$ is turned off". This can be written to a material conditional statement $\forall x \in B: P(x) \Rightarrow Q(x)$ where $B$ is the set of all things in the room (including cell phones if they exist in the room), the antecedent $P(x)$ is "$x$ is a cell phone", and the consequent $Q(x)$ is "$x$ is turned off".
- $\forall \xi: Q(\xi)$, where the symbol $\xi$ is restricted to a type that has no representatives.

Vacuous truths most commonly appear in classical logic with two truth values. However, vacuous truths can also appear in, for example, intuitionistic logic, in the same situations as given above. Indeed, if $P$ is false, then $P \Rightarrow Q$ will yield a vacuous truth in any logic that uses the material conditional; if $P$ is a necessary falsehood, then it will also yield a vacuous truth under the strict conditional.

Other non-classical logics, such as relevance logic, may attempt to avoid vacuous truths by using alternative conditionals (such as the case of the counterfactual conditional).

== In computer programming ==
Many programming environments have a mechanism for querying if every item in a collection of items satisfies some predicate. It is common for such a query to always evaluate as true for an empty collection. For example:

- In JavaScript, the array method every executes a provided callback function once for each element present in the array, only stopping (if and when) it finds an element where the callback function returns false. Notably, calling the every method on an empty array will return true for any condition.
- In Python, the built-in all() function returns True only when all of the elements of an iterable (in this example, a list) are True or the iterable is empty: all([1,1])==True; all([1,1,0])==False; all([])==True. A less ambiguous way to express this is to say all() returns True when none of the elements are False.
- In Rust, the Iterator::all function accepts an iterator and a predicate and returns true only when the predicate returns true for all items produced by the iterator, or if the iterator produces no items.
- In SQL, the function, the function ANY_VALUE can differ depending on the RDBMS's behaviour relating NULLs to vacuous truth. Some RDBMS might return null even if there are non-null values. Some DBMS might not allow for its use in filter(...) or over(.. ) clauses.
- In Kotlin, the collection method all returns true when the collection is empty.
- In C#, the Linq method All returns true when the collection is empty.
- In C++, the std::all_of function template returns true for an empty collection.
- In Agda, an empty type (for example, ⊥, which is defined with no constructors) is 'false' at the type level, following the Curry–Howard correspondence. A parameter of such a type can be matched against an 'absurd' pattern and an equation containing such a pattern has no right hand side. The principle of ex falso quodlibet can be defined this way as a function efq : ∀ {n} {a : Set n} → ⊥ → a. The function efq is then a proof of the vacuously true proposition ⊥ → a for every proposition (i.e. type) a. For example, it is a proof of ⊥ → ⊥.

== Examples ==
These examples, one from mathematics and one from natural language, illustrate the concept of vacuous truths:

- "For any integer x, if x > 5 then x > 3." – This statement is true non-vacuously (since some integers are indeed greater than 5), but some of its implications are only vacuously true: for example, when x is the integer 2, the statement implies the vacuous truth that "if 2 > 5 then 2 > 3".
- "All my children are goats" is a vacuous truth when spoken by someone without children. Similarly, "None of my children are goats" would also be a vacuous truth when spoken by the same person.

== See also ==
- Counterfactual conditional (linguistics)
- Definite description
- De Morgan's laws – specifically the law that a universal statement is true just in case no counterexample exists: $\forall x \, P(x) \equiv \neg \exists x \, \neg P(x)$
- Empty sum and empty product
- Empty function
- Paradoxes of material implication, especially the principle of explosion
- Presupposition, double question
- State of affairs (philosophy)
- Tautology (logic) – another type of true statement that also fails to convey any substantive information
- Triviality (mathematics) and degeneracy (mathematics)

== Bibliography ==
- Blackburn, Simon (1994). "vacuous", The Oxford Dictionary of Philosophy. Oxford: Oxford University Press, p. 388.
- David H. Sanford (1999). "implication". The Cambridge Dictionary of Philosophy, 2nd. ed., p. 420.
- Beer, Ilan; Ben-David, Shoham; Eisner, Cindy; Rodeh, Yoav (1997). "Efficient Detection of Vacuity in ACTL Formulas". Computer Aided Verification: 9th International Conference, CAV'97 Haifa, Israel, June 22–25, 1997, Proceedings. Lecture Notes in Computer Science. Vol. 1254. pp. 279–290. doi:10.1007/3-540-63166-6_28. ISBN 978-3-540-63166-8.
