= Logical double negation =

Logical double negation may refer to:

- Logical double negation (logic)
- Logical double negation (linguistics)
