= Strict conditional =

Formal statement in logic

In logic, a strict conditional (symbol: $\Box$, or ⥽) is a conditional governed by a modal operator, that is, a logical connective of modal logic. It is logically equivalent to the material conditional of classical logic, combined with the necessity operator from modal logic. For any two propositions p and q, the formula p → q says that p materially implies q while $\Box (p \rightarrow q)$ says that p strictly implies q. Strict conditionals are the result of Clarence Irving Lewis's attempt to find a conditional for logic that can adequately express indicative conditionals in natural language. They have also been used in studying Molinist theology.

== Avoiding paradoxes ==
The strict conditionals may avoid paradoxes of material implication. The following statement, for example, is not correctly formalized by material implication:

If Bill Gates graduated in medicine, then Elvis never died.

This condition should clearly be false: the degree of Bill Gates has nothing to do with whether Elvis is still alive. However, the direct encoding of this formula in classical logic using material implication leads to:

Bill Gates graduated in medicine → Elvis never died.

This formula is true because whenever the antecedent A is false, a formula A → B is true. Hence, this formula is not an adequate translation of the original sentence. An encoding using the strict conditional is:

$\Box$ (Bill Gates graduated in medicine → Elvis never died).

In modal logic, this formula means (roughly) that, in every possible world in which Bill Gates graduated in medicine, Elvis never died. Since one can easily imagine a world where Bill Gates is a medicine graduate and Elvis is dead, this formula is false. Hence, this formula seems to be a correct translation of the original sentence.

== Problems ==
Although the strict conditional is much closer to being able to express natural language conditionals than the material conditional, it has its own problems with consequents that are necessarily true (such as 2 + 2 = 4) or antecedents that are necessarily false. The following sentence, for example, is not correctly formalized by a strict conditional:

If Bill Gates graduated in medicine, then 2 + 2 = 4.

Using strict conditionals, this sentence is expressed as:

$\Box$ (Bill Gates graduated in medicine → 2 + 2 = 4)

In modal logic, this formula means that, in every possible world where Bill Gates graduated in medicine, it holds that 2 + 2 = 4. Since 2 + 2 is equal to 4 in all possible worlds, this formula is true, although it does not seem that the original sentence should be. A similar situation arises with 2 + 2 = 5, which is necessarily false:

If 2 + 2 = 5, then Bill Gates graduated in medicine.

Some logicians view this situation as indicating that the strict conditional is still unsatisfactory. Others have noted that the strict conditional cannot adequately express counterfactual conditionals, and that it does not satisfy certain logical properties. In particular, the strict conditional is transitive, while the counterfactual conditional is not.

Some logicians, such as Paul Grice, have used conversational implicature to argue that, despite apparent difficulties, the material conditional is just fine as a translation for the natural language 'if...then...'. Others still have turned to relevance logic to supply a connection between the antecedent and consequent of provable conditionals.

== Constructive logic ==
In a constructive setting, the symmetry between ⥽ and $\Box$ is broken, and the two connectives can be studied independently. Constructive strict implication can be used to investigate interpretability of Heyting arithmetic and to model arrows and guarded recursion in computer science.

== See also ==
- Corresponding conditional
- Counterfactual conditional
- Dynamic semantics
- Import-Export
- Indicative conditional
- Logical consequence
- Material conditional

== Bibliography ==
- Edgington, Dorothy, 2001, "Conditionals," in Goble, Lou, ed., The Blackwell Guide to Philosophical Logic. Blackwell.
- For an introduction to non-classical logic as an attempt to find a better translation of the conditional, see:
  - Priest, Graham, 2001. An Introduction to Non-Classical Logic. Cambridge Univ. Press.
- For an extended philosophical discussion of the issues mentioned in this article, see:
  - Mark Sainsbury, 2001. Logical Forms. Blackwell Publishers.
- Jonathan Bennett, 2003. A Philosophical Guide to Conditionals. Oxford Univ. Press.
