= Import–export (logic) =

Principle of classical logic

In propositional logic, import-export is a name given to the propositional form of Exportation:

$$(P \rightarrow ( Q \rightarrow R )) \leftrightarrow ((P \land Q) \rightarrow R)$$.

This already holds in minimal logic, and thus also in classical logic, where the conditional operator "$\rightarrow$" is taken as material implication. In the Curry-Howard correspondence for intuitionistic logics, it can be realized through currying and uncurrying.

== Discussion ==
Import-export expresses a deductive argument form. In natural language terms, the formula states that the following English sentences are logically equivalent:

1. If Mary isn't at home, then if Sally isn't at home, then the house is empty.
2. If Mary isn't home and Sally isn't home, then the house is empty.

There are logics where it does not hold and its status as a true principle of logic is a matter of debate. Controversy over the principle arises from the fact that any conditional operator that satisfies it will collapse to material implication when combined with certain other principles. This conclusion would be problematic given the paradoxes of material implication, which are commonly taken to show that natural language conditionals are not material implication.

This problematic conclusion can be avoided within the framework of dynamic semantics, whose expressive power allows one to define a non-material conditional operator which nonetheless satisfies import-export along with the other principles. However, other approaches reject import-export as a general principle, motivated by cases such as the following, uttered in a context where it is most likely that the match will be lit by throwing it into a campfire, but where it is possible that it could be lit by striking it. In this context, the first sentence is intuitively true but the second is intuitively false.

1. If you strike the match and it lights, it will light.
2. If the match lights, it will light if you strike it.

== See also ==
- Counterfactuals
- Modus ponens
- Paradoxes of material implication
- Strict conditional
- Currying
