= Paradoxes of material implication =

Type of logical contradiction

The paradoxes of material implication are a group of classically true formulae involving material conditionals whose translations into natural language are intuitively false when the conditional is translated with English words such as "implies" or "if ... then ...". They are sometimes phrased as arguments, since they are easily turned into arguments with modus ponens: if it is true that "if $P$ then $Q$" ($P \rightarrow Q$), then from that together with $P$, one may argue for $Q$. Among them are the following:

Propositional formula	Paraphrase in English, with example	Names in the literature
$p \rightarrow (q \rightarrow p)$	"If P, then if Q, then P"; a true proposition is implied by any other proposition. For instance, it is a valid argument that "there is no integer n greater than or equal to 3 such that for some positive integers x,y,z, x^{n} = y^{n} + z^{n}. Therefore, if the sky is blue, then there is no integer n greater than or equal to 3 such that for some positive integers x,y,z, x^{n} = y^{n} + z^{n}."	positive paradox
$p \rightarrow (q \lor \lnot q)$	"If P, then Q or not Q" (a particular case of the above); a disjunction between a proposition and its negation, since it is a classical tautology, is implied by anything. For instance, this proposition is considered classically true: "If The moon is made of green cheese, either it is raining in Ecuador now or it is not." So is this one: "If my dog barks at rubbish collectors, then either it is raining in Bolivia right now or it is not."	No common names in the literature. (Note: The formulas with no common name are usually referred to generically as a "paradox of material implication" (or "paradox of strict implication" where applicable) or given a number for reference, naturally a different number in each publication.) It is also a paradox of strict implication.
$\lnot p \rightarrow (p \rightarrow q)$	"If it is not the case that P, then if P, then Q"; a false proposition implies any other. For instance, if Socrates was not a solar myth, then "Socrates was a solar myth" implies 2+2=5. Or, given that the moon is not made of cheese, then it is true that "if the moon is made of cheese, it is made of ketchup".	vacuous truth
$(p \land \lnot p) \rightarrow q$	"If it is the case that P and it is not the case that P, then it is the case that Q"; anything follows from a contradiction. For instance, it is a valid argument that "If Pat is both a mother and not a mother, then Pat is a father".	principle of explosion, or paradox of entailment. It is also a paradox of strict implication.
$(p \rightarrow q) \lor (q \rightarrow r)$	"Either if P then Q, or if Q then R, or both"; a proposition is either implied by any other (which happens when it is true) or implies any other (which happens when it is false). For example, it is a tautologically true proposition that "either the fact that this article was edited by a Brazilian implies that it is accurate, or this article's accuracy implies that it was edited by an Englishman".	No common names in the literature.
$(p \rightarrow q) \lor (q \rightarrow p)$	"Either if P then Q, or if Q then P, or both" (a particular case of the above); of two propositions, either the first implies the second, or the second implies the first. For example, it is a tautologically true proposition that "either the Continuum Hypothesis implies the Collatz Conjecture, or the Collatz Conjecture implies the Continuum Hypothesis".	No common names in the literature.

Russell's definition of "p implies q" as synonymous with "either not p or q" solicited the justified objection that according to it a true proposition is implied by any proposition and a false proposition implies any proposition (paradoxes of material implication).

— Arthur Pap, Elements of Analytic Philosophy

A material conditional formula $P \rightarrow Q$ is true unless $P$ is true and $Q$ is false; it is synonymous with "either P is false, or Q is true, or both". This gives rise to vacuous truths such as, "if 2+2=5, then this Wikipedia article is accurate", which is true regardless of the contents of this article, because the antecedent is false. Given that such problematic consequences follow from an extremely popular and widely accepted model of reasoning, namely the material implication in classical logic, they are called paradoxes. They demonstrate a mismatch between classical logic and robust intuitions about meaning and reasoning.

== Subjunctives (counterfactuals) ==
Another counterintuitive feature of material conditionals which is often discussed in connection with the paradoxes of material implication is that they are unsuited for modelling intuitive reasoning with subjunctive statements. A popular example to illustrate this (so popular that it is used by every source cited in this paragraph) is the Oswald–Kennedy example, due to a 1970 paper by Ernest W. Adams. According to Adams, this indicative conditional is true: "If Oswald did not shoot Kennedy, then someone else did". This is true because Kennedy was indeed shot. However, it is generally believed that this subjunctive conditional is not known to be true: "If Oswald hadn't shot Kennedy, someone else would have". (Many sources reserve the name of "counterfactual conditional" for the subjunctive, although if Oswald did shoot Kennedy, both conditionals are counterfactual in the sense of having an antecedent which is "contrary to fact", which is still a current usage, although less popular.) Even if someone believes himself to know the truth of the subjunctive conditional, he would still usually think that it has a different meaning or content from the indicative conditional. However, if someone were to model both using the material conditional in propositional logic, they would both be $\lnot O \rightarrow S$, read "if it is not the case that O, then it is the case that S", where O stands for "Oswald shot Kennedy" and S stands for "Someone else shot Kennedy". This modelling, if accepted for both statements, would imply that the indicative and the subjunctive statement are equivalent, which is counterintuitive and thus, in this sense, paradoxical. Given such a model, a supporter of the Nazi Party could validly argue in classical logic, for instance, that "If the Nazis had won World War Two, everybody would be happy", which is vacuously true because it is indeed false that the Nazis won World War Two.

If we extend this convention to human activities, then the statement "If Hitler had won World War II then Europe would now be a single nation" is trivially true, because Hitler did not win World War II. But "If Hitler had won World War II then pigs would now have wings" is also trivially true, for the same reason. In modal logic, however, it would be sensible to debate the truth or falsity of the first of these statements, depending on how history might have changed if the Nazis had won the war. The second would be false, because pigs don't have wings.

— Ian Stewart, Professor Stewart's Cabinet of Mathematical Curiosities

Although examples such as the Oswald–Kennedy example are widely seen as motivating an analysis of subjunctives which is different from the material conditional, theorists (philosophers, logicians, semanticists) differ on precisely what analysis of subjunctives to use in place of the material conditional. Some analyze subjunctive conditionals as fundamentally different from indicative, some instead view all conditionals as having a domain or context, and some analyses focus on accounting for verb tense, viewing the distinctive feature of these conditionals as that they have an antecedent which is in the past.

== Solutions ==
Classical logic, with the material implication connective, remains widely used despite the paradoxes, because most users simply get used to them or ignore them, judging the paradoxes to be minor drawbacks compared with the benefits of the material conditional's "considerable virtues of simplicity" and logical strength. Anderson and Belnap, in their seminal book Entailment on relevant logic, represented what they called the "Official" (classical-logical) view as follows:

To be sure, there are certain odd theorems such as A→(B→A) and A→(B→B) which might offend the naive, and indeed these have been referred to in the literature as "paradoxes of implication." But this terminology reflects a misunderstanding. "If A, then if B then A" really means no more than "Either not-A, or else not-B or A," and the latter is clearly a logical truth; hence so is the former. Properly understood there are no "paradoxes" of implication.

Similarly, E.J. Lemmon was conscious of the suspicious appearance of the paradoxes, and designed his popular textbook Beginning Logic to subtly discourage suspicion about them, by first introducing the natural deduction rules for propositional logic and only speaking of truth tables afterwards.

=== Strict implication ===
C.I. Lewis was motivated by the paradoxes $\lnot p \rightarrow (p \rightarrow q)$ and $p \rightarrow (q \rightarrow p)$ to invent strict implication. Strict implication retains the principle of explosion $(p \land \lnot p) \rightarrow q$, which Lewis regarded as an a priori truth, but which others still consider a paradox (a "paradox of strict implication") since an impossibility such as 2+2=5 can seem irrelevant to various facts which one may try to prove from it.

=== Relevance logic ===
The paradoxes of material and strict implication have been motivations for the development of relevance logics (also called relevant logics), where the principles of logic are weakened in ways that prevent the derivation of the paradoxes as valid.

== See also ==
- Connexive logics were designed to exclude the paradoxes of material implication
- Correlation does not imply causation
- Counterfactuals
- False dilemma
- Import-Export
- List of paradoxes
- Modus ponens
- The Moon is made of green cheese
- Relevance logic arose out of attempts to avoid these paradoxes
- Vacuous truth
