= Corresponding conditional =

In logic, the corresponding conditional of an argument (or derivation) is a material conditional whose antecedent is the conjunction of the argument's (or derivation's) premises and whose consequent is the argument's conclusion. An argument is valid if and only if its corresponding conditional is a logical truth. It follows that an argument is valid if and only if the negation of its corresponding conditional is a contradiction. Therefore, the construction of a corresponding conditional provides a useful technique for determining the validity of an argument.

== Example ==
Consider the argument A:

Either it is hot or it is cold
It is not hot
Therefore it is cold

This argument is of the form:

Either P or Q
Not P
Therefore Q

or (using standard symbols of propositional calculus):

P $\lor$ Q
$\neg$P
____________
Q

The corresponding conditional C is:

IF ((P or Q) and not P) THEN Q

or (using standard symbols):

((P $\lor$ Q) $\wedge$ $\neg$P)$\to$ Q

and the argument A is valid just in case the corresponding conditional C is a logical truth.

If C is a logical truth then $\neg$C entails Falsity (The False).

Thus, any argument is valid if and only if the denial of its corresponding conditional leads to a contradiction.

If we construct a truth table for C we will find that it comes out T (true) on every row (and of course if we construct a truth table for the negation of C it will come out F (false) in every row. These results confirm the validity of the argument A

Some arguments need first-order predicate logic to reveal their forms and they cannot be tested properly by truth tables forms.

Consider the argument A1:

Some mortals are not Greeks
Some Greeks are not men
Not every man is a logician
Therefore Some mortals are not logicians

To test this argument for validity, construct the corresponding conditional C1 (you will need first-order predicate logic), negate it, and see if you can derive a contradiction from it. If you succeed, then the argument is valid.

== Application ==
Instead of attempting to derive the conclusion from the premises proceed as follows.

To test the validity of an argument (a) translate, as necessary, each premise and the conclusion into sentential or predicate logic sentences (b) construct from these the negation of the corresponding conditional (c) see if from it a contradiction can be derived (or if feasible construct a truth table for it and see if it comes out false on every row.) Alternatively construct a truth tree and see if every branch is closed. Success proves the validity of the original argument.

In case of the difficulty in trying to derive a contradiction, one should proceed as follows. From the negation of the corresponding conditional derive a theorem in conjunctive normal form in the methodical fashions described in text books. If, and only if, the original argument was valid will the theorem in conjunctive normal form be a contradiction, and if it is, then that it is will be apparent.
