= Double negation =

Propositional logic theorem

- Type: Theorem
- Field: Propositional calculus; Classical logic
- Statement: If a statement is true, then it is not the case that the statement is not true, and vice versa."
- Symbolic statement: $A \equiv \ \sim(\sim A)$

In propositional logic, the double negation of a statement states that "it is not the case that the statement is not true". In classical logic, every statement is logically equivalent to its double negation, but this is not true in intuitionistic logic; this can be expressed by the formula A ≡ ~(~A) where the sign ≡ expresses logical equivalence and the sign ~ expresses negation.

Like the law of the excluded middle, this principle is considered to be a law of thought in classical logic, but it is disallowed by intuitionistic logic. The principle was stated as a theorem of propositional logic by Russell and Whitehead in Principia Mathematica as:

$\mathbf{*4\cdot13}. \ \ \vdash.\ p \ \equiv \ \thicksim(\thicksim p)$
"This is the principle of double negation, i.e. a proposition is equivalent of the falsehood of its negation."

== Elimination and introduction ==
Double negation elimination and double negation introduction are two valid rules of replacement. They are the inferences that, if not not-A is true, then A is true, and its converse, that, if A is true, then not not-A is true, respectively. The rule allows one to introduce or eliminate a negation from a formal proof. The rule is based on the equivalence of, for example, It is false that it is not raining. and It is raining.

The double negation introduction rule is:

P $\Rightarrow$ $\neg$$\neg$P

and the double negation elimination rule is:

$\neg$$\neg$P $\Rightarrow$ P

In logics that have both rules, negation is an involution.

=== Formal notation ===
The double negation introduction rule may be written in sequent notation:
$$P \vdash \neg \neg P$$

The double negation elimination rule may be written as:
$$\neg \neg P \vdash P$$

In rule form:
$$\frac{P}{\neg \neg P}$$
and
$$\frac{\neg \neg P}{P}$$

or as a tautology (plain propositional calculus sentence):
$$P \to \neg \neg P$$
and
$$\neg \neg P \to P$$

These can be combined into a single biconditional formula:
$$\neg \neg P \leftrightarrow P.$$

Since biconditionality is an equivalence relation, any instance of ¬¬A in a well-formed formula can be replaced by A, leaving unchanged the truth-value of the well-formed formula.

Double negative elimination is a theorem of classical logic, but not of weaker logics such as intuitionistic logic and minimal logic. Double negation introduction is a theorem of both intuitionistic logic and minimal logic, as is $\neg \neg \neg A \vdash \neg A$.

Because of their constructive character, a statement such as It's not the case that it's not raining is weaker than It's raining. The latter requires a proof of rain, whereas the former merely requires a proof that rain would not be contradictory. This distinction also arises in natural language in the form of litotes.

== Proofs ==
=== In classical propositional calculus system ===
In Hilbert-style deductive systems for propositional logic, double negation is not always taken as an axiom (see list of Hilbert systems), and is rather a theorem. We describe a proof of this theorem in the system of three axioms proposed by Jan Łukasiewicz:

A1. $\phi \to \left( \psi \to \phi \right)$
A2. $\left( \phi \to \left( \psi \rightarrow \xi \right) \right) \to \left( \left( \phi \to \psi \right) \to \left( \phi \to \xi \right) \right)$
A3. $\left ( \lnot \phi \to \lnot \psi \right) \to \left( \psi \to \phi \right)$

We use the lemma $p \to p$ proved here, which we refer to as (L1), and use the following additional lemma, proved here:

(L2) $p \to ((p \to q) \to q)$

We first prove $\neg \neg p \to p$. For shortness, we denote $q \to ( r \to q )$ by φ_{0}. We also use repeatedly the method of the hypothetical syllogism metatheorem as a shorthand for several proof steps.

(1) $\varphi_0$ (instance of (A1))
(2) $(\neg \neg \varphi_0 \to \neg \neg p ) \to (\neg p \to \neg \varphi_0)$ (instance of (A3))
(3) $(\neg p \to \neg \varphi_0) \to (\varphi_0 \to p )$ (instance of (A3))
(4) $(\neg \neg \varphi_0 \to \neg \neg p ) \to (\varphi_0 \to p )$ (from (2) and (3) by the hypothetical syllogism metatheorem)
(5) $\neg \neg p \to ( \neg \neg \varphi_0 \to \neg \neg p )$ (instance of (A1))
(6) $\neg \neg p \to (\varphi_0 \to p )$ (from (4) and (5) by the hypothetical syllogism metatheorem)
(7) $\varphi_0 \to ((\varphi_0 \to p) \to p)$ (instance of (L2))
(8) $(\varphi_0 \to p) \to p$ (from (1) and (7) by modus ponens)
(9) $\neg \neg p \to p$ (from (6) and (8) by the hypothetical syllogism metatheorem)

We now prove $p \to \neg \neg p$.

(1) $\neg\neg\neg p \to \neg p$ (instance of the first part of the theorem we have just proven)
(2) $(\neg\neg\neg p \to \neg p) \to (p \to \neg\neg p)$ (instance of (A3))
(3) $p \to \neg \neg p$ (from (1) and (2) by modus ponens)

And the proof is complete.

== See also ==
- Gödel–Gentzen negative translation

== Bibliography ==
- William Hamilton, 1860, Lectures on Metaphysics and Logic, Vol. II. Logic; Edited by Henry Mansel and John Veitch, Boston, Gould and Lincoln.
- Christoph Sigwart, 1895, Logic: The Judgment, Concept, and Inference; Second Edition, Translated by Helen Dendy, Macmillan & Co. New York.
- Stephen C. Kleene, 1952, Introduction to Metamathematics, 6th reprinting with corrections 1971, North-Holland Publishing Company, Amsterdam NY, ISBN 0-7204-2103-9.
- Stephen C. Kleene, 1967, Mathematical Logic, Dover edition 2002, Dover Publications, Inc, Mineola N.Y. ISBN 0-486-42533-9
- Alfred North Whitehead and Bertrand Russell, Principia Mathematica to *56, 2nd edition 1927, reprint 1962, Cambridge at the University Press.
