= Jonathan Bennett (philosopher) =

New Zealander philosopher (1930–2024)

- Born: Jonathan Francis Bennett; 17 February 1930; Greymouth, New Zealand
- Died: 31 March 2024 (aged 94); Bowen Island, British Columbia, Canada

Education
- Education: University of Canterbury (M.A., 1953); Magdalen College, Oxford (BPhil, 1955)
- Academic advisor: J. L. Austin

Philosophical work
- Era: Contemporary philosophy
- Region: Western philosophy
- School: Analytic
- Institutions: Syracuse University
- Main interests: Philosophy of mind, metaphysics, philosophy of language, ethics
- Notable ideas: Equivalence thesis (no moral difference between killing and letting die)

Jonathan Francis Bennett (17 February 1930 – 31 March 2024) was a philosopher, a specialist in Kant's work, and a historian of early modern philosophy. He had New Zealand citizenship by birth and later acquired UK and Canadian citizenship.

== Life and education ==
Jonathan Bennett was born in Greymouth, New Zealand, to Francis Oswald Bennett and Pearl Allan Brash Bennett. His father was a doctor and his mother a homemaker. He read philosophy at the University of Canterbury (formerly Canterbury University College) and was awarded his M.A. there in 1953. He then went to the University of Oxford where he was a member of Magdalen College, Oxford. He obtained his BPhil in 1955.

He and his wife (Gillian Bennett) share two children (Sara Fox-Laforest (nee Bennett) and Guy Bennett) and six grandchildren. Gillian Bennett was herself a professional psychologist. The pair eventually retired to British Columbia, Canada where Jonathan Bennett continued his work online on Early Modern Texts – a source utilized by numerous post-secondary students in support of their course work.

== Career ==
Bennett's first academic post was as a junior lecturer at the University of Auckland (then Auckland University College), New Zealand (1952). He was an instructor in philosophy at Haverford College (Pennsylvania) (1955–56), then a lecturer in moral science (philosophy) at the University of Cambridge (1956–68), then at Simon Fraser University (1968–70), the University of British Columbia (1970–79), and in 1979 he went to Syracuse University as professor of philosophy. He remained in this position until his retirement in 1997.

In 1980, he was the Tanner Lecturer at Brasenose College of the University of Oxford. His lectures were refined and published in his 1995 book The Act Itself. In this work, he argues that letting someone die is as immoral as killing someone. This also applies to other harms that one commits or fails to prevent. This view has been widely discussed, for example by Judith Jarvis Thomson.

In 1992, he was the John Locke Lecturer at the University of Oxford, giving lectures on 'Judging Behaviour: Analysis in Moral Theory'.

In 1985, he was elected a Fellow of the American Academy of Arts and Sciences. The British Academy extended him the same honour in 1991. In the same year he was awarded a LittD from the University of Cambridge.

Bennett wrote extensively on philosophy of mind, philosophy of language, events, conditionals, and consequentialist ethics. He was renowned for his interpretations of major early modern philosophers and wrote five books in this area. A Festschrift to commemorate his 60th birthday was published in 1990.

Bennett's website was devoted to making the texts of early modern philosophers more accessible to today's students.

Bennett died aged 94 on 31 March 2024.

== Bibliography ==
Books

- 1989 (1964). Rationality. Hackett.
- 1966. Kant's Analytic. Cambridge University Press.
- 1971. Locke, Berkeley, Hume: Central Themes. Oxford University Press.
- 1974. Kant's Dialectic. Cambridge University Press.
- 1990 (1976). Linguistic Behaviour. Hackett.
- 1984. A Study of Spinoza’s Ethics. Hackett.
- 1988. Events and Their Names. Hackett.
- 1995. The Act Itself. Oxford University Press.
- 2001. Learning from Six Philosophers. Oxford University Press.
- 2003. A Philosophical Guide to Conditionals. Oxford University Press.

Selected journal articles

- 1954. 'Meaning and Implication', Mind, 63, pp. 451–63.
- 1965. 'Substance, Reality and Primary Qualities', American Philosophical Quarterly, 2, pp. 1–17.
- 1988. 'Thoughtful Brutes', Proceedings of the American Philosophical Association, 62 pp. 197–210.
- 1993. 'Negation and Abstention: Two theories of Allowing', Ethics, 104, pp. 75–96.
