= Ingebrigt Johansson =

Norwegian mathematician (1904–1987)

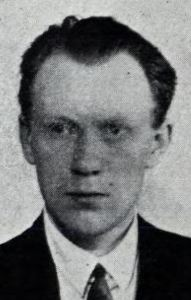
- Ingebrigt Johansson
- Born: 24 October 1904; Narvik
- Died: 24 April 1987 (aged 82); Oslo
- Education: University of Oslo (1923); Bonn (1929); Frankfurt a.M. (1930 - 1931)
- Known for: Minimal logic
- Spouse: Gidske Jacoba Schult
- Parents: Isak Johansson (father); Gjertrud Kletten (mother)
- Scientific career
- Fields: mathematics; logic
- Thesis: Topologische Untersuchungen über unverzweigte Überlagerungsflächen (1931)

Ingebrigt Johansson (24 October 1904 – 24 April 1987) was a Norwegian mathematician. He developed the symbolic logic system known as minimal logic.

== Biography ==
Johansson was born in Narvik, the son of bricklayer Isak Johansson (1849–1941) and Gjertrud Kletten (1865–1948). In 1941 he married Gidske Jacoba Schult (1908–1994). He died in Oslo, Norway on 24 April 1987.

In 1923 Johansson entered the University of Oslo to study mathematics. After he received his Candidatus realium degree in 1928 he continued his studies in Bonn in 1929 and in Frankfurt a.M. in 1930 and 1931. In 1931 he received his doctorate (Dr. philos) from the University of Oslo for his dissertation "Topologische Untersuchungen über unverzweigte Überlagerungsflächen".

He spent his professional career at the University of Oslo, from 1931 to 1936 as a fellow in geometry, from 1936 to 1942 as a lecturer in descriptive geometry and finally as a professor of mathematics from 1946 (his appointment dated from 1942). From 1935 to 1946 Johansson served as president of the Norwegian Mathematical Society. He was elected to the Norwegian Academy of Science and Letters in 1937.

He put great effort into mathematical didactics, experimenting with new methods in teaching and introducing new exam forms such as critique and comment tasks. He also wrote several textbooks and worked on curriculum reforms for the Oslo mathematics faculty. He died in Oslo.

== Bibliography ==
- Birkeland, Bent (1997). "Matematikklærerne ved Universitetet i Oslo" (in Norwegian). Archived from the original on 12 April 2008.
- Bøhn, Einar Duenger; Linnebo, Øystein (2020). "Interview with Dagfinn Føllesdal". Norsk Filosofisk Tidsskrift. 55 (1): 46–79. doi:10.18261/issn.1504-2901-2020-01-05. S2CID 216488439.
- Johansson, Ingebrigt (1931). Topologische Untersuchungen über unverzweigte Überlagerungsflächen. Skrifter (Det Norske videnskaps-akademi i Oslo : trykt utg.), nr.: 1931, no. 1 (in German). Oslo: Kommisjon hos Dybwad.
- Johansson, Ingebrigt (1937). "Der Minimalkalkül, ein reduzierter intuitionistischer Formalismus". Compositio Mathematica (in German). 4: 119–136.
- Steenstrup, Bjørn (1973). Hvem er Hvem? (in Norwegian). Oslo: Aschehoug. ISBN 9788203048869.
