= Consequent =

Hypothetical proposition component

A consequent is the second half of a hypothetical proposition. In the standard form of such a proposition, it is the part that follows "then". In an implication, if P implies Q, then P is called the antecedent and Q is called the consequent. In some contexts, the consequent is called the apodosis.

Examples:

- If $P$, then $Q$.

$Q$ is the consequent of this hypothetical proposition.

- If $X$ is a mammal, then $X$ is an animal.

Here, "$X$ is an animal" is the consequent.

- If computers can think, then they are alive.

"They are alive" is the consequent.

The consequent in a hypothetical proposition is not necessarily a consequence of the antecedent.

- If monkeys are purple, then fish speak Klingon.

"Fish speak Klingon" is the consequent here, but intuitively is not a consequence of (nor does it have anything to do with) the claim made in the antecedent that "monkeys are purple".

== See also ==
- Antecedent (logic)
- Conjecture
- Necessity and sufficiency
