= Johannes Moreelse =

Dutch baroque painter (c.1603–1634)

Johannes Paulus Moreelse
- Born: c. 1603; Zundert, Netherlands
- Died: October 1634 (aged 30–31); Zundert, Netherlands
- Known for: Painting
- Movement: Baroque

Johannes Paulus Moreelse, or Johan Pauwelszon Moreelse (c. 1603 – October 1634), was a Dutch baroque painter belonging to the school of Utrecht Caravaggism during the Dutch Golden Age.

== Life ==
Moreelse was born in Utrecht, Holland. His father, Paulus Moreelse, was at that time a famous portrait painter. Little is known about his life. Johan Moreelse studied in Utrecht, in the studio of his father, and then in Rome (1627), where he was appointed into a papal knight order. Moreelse died in his home town during a plague epidemic. His small number of known works were only assigned to him in the 1970s.

== Gallery ==
Paintings by Johannes Moreelse

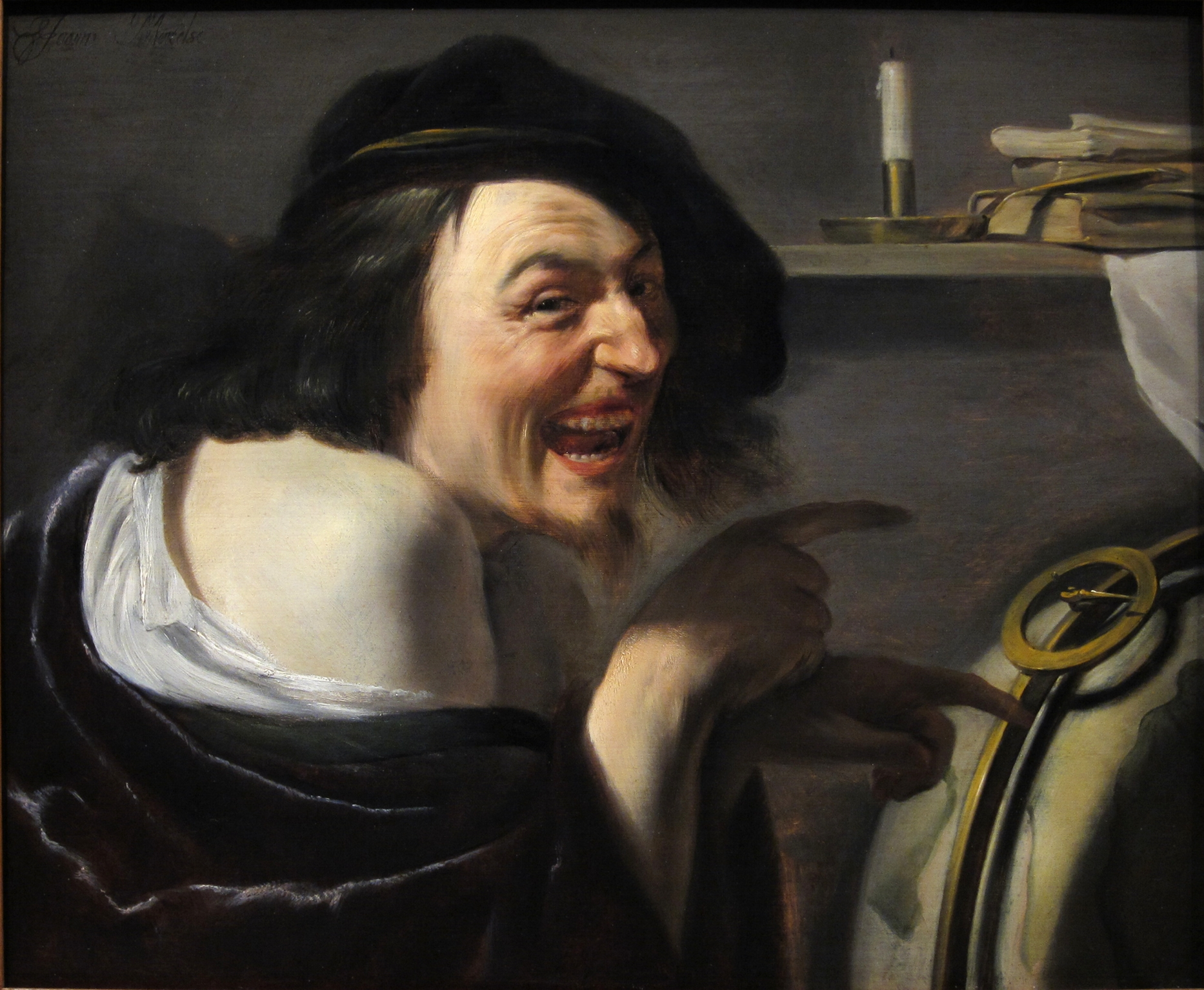
Democritus, c. 1630, Centraal Museum, Utrecht, Netherlands

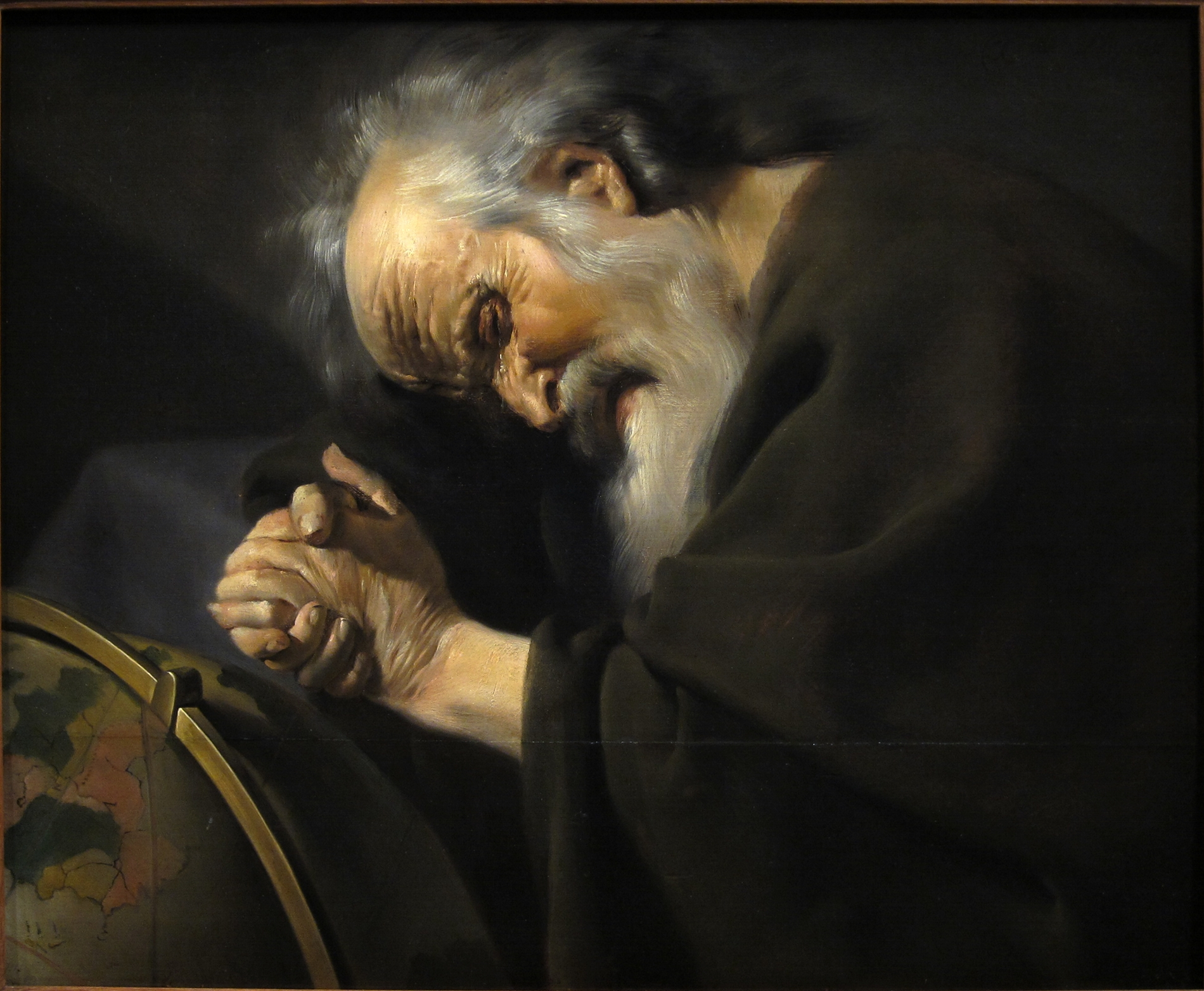
Heraclitus, c. 1630, Centraal Museum, Utrecht, Netherlands

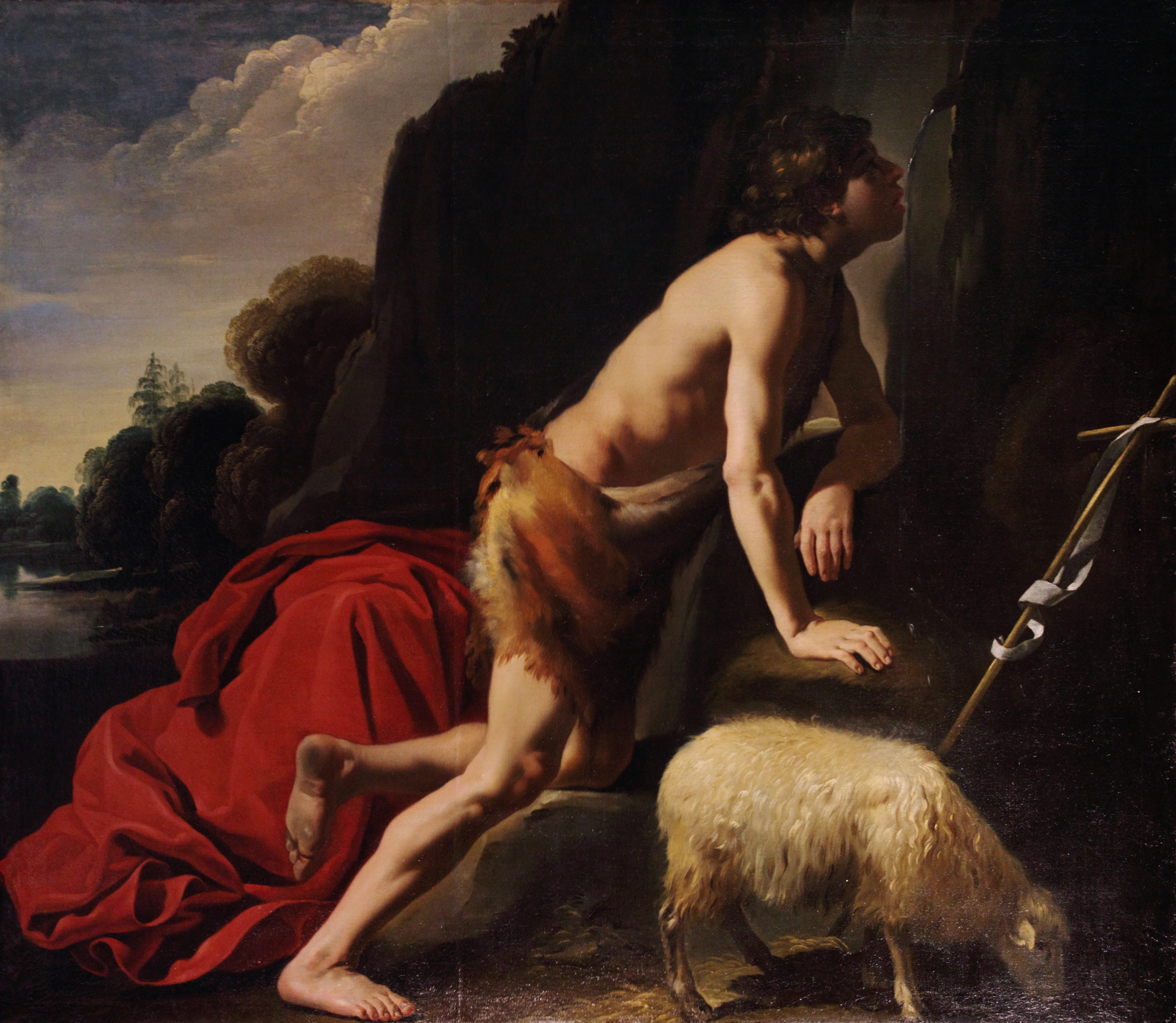
Saint Jean-Baptiste, c. 1630, Museum of Fine Arts of Lyon, Lyon, France

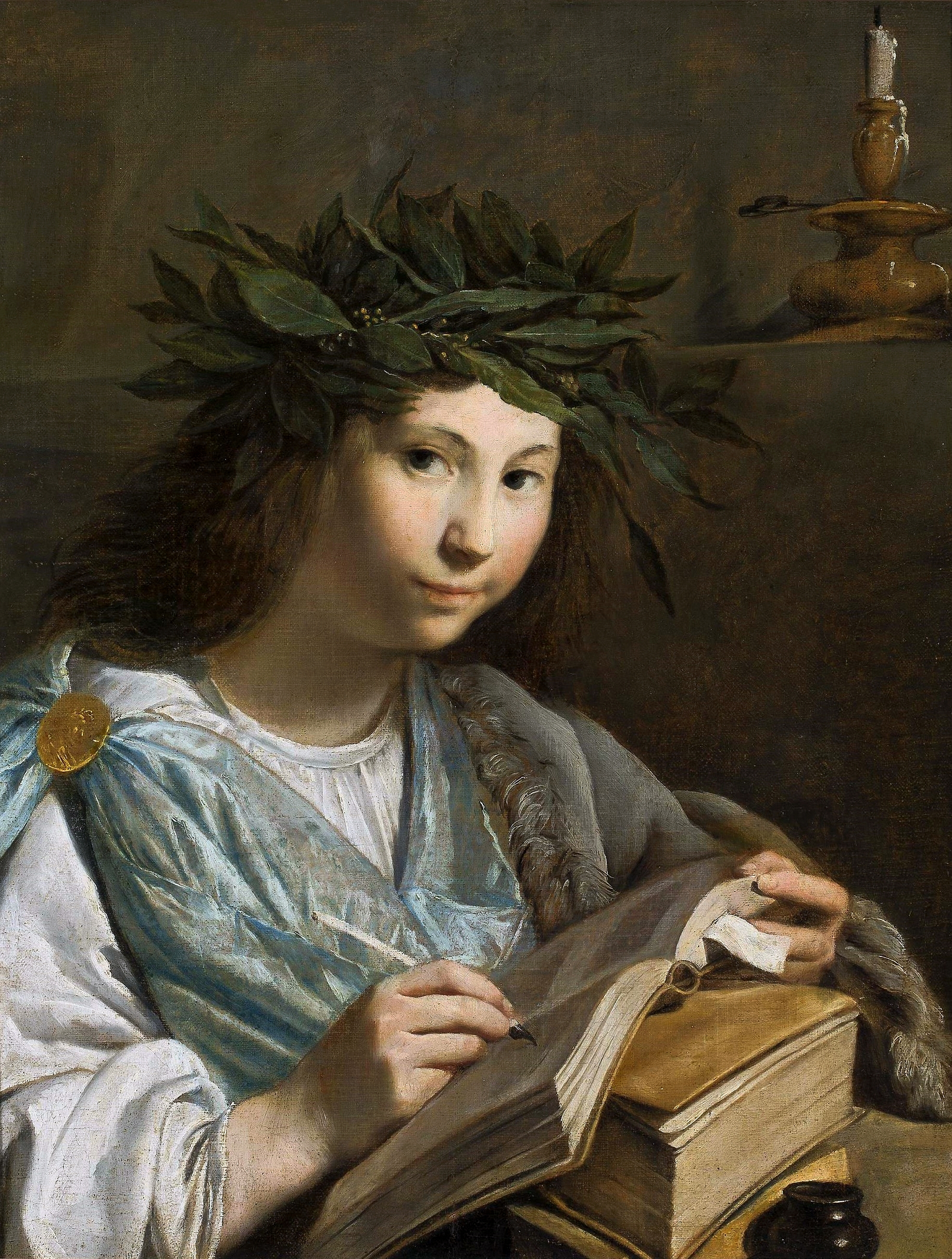
Clio: Muse of History, c. 1634, National Museum, Warsaw, Poland

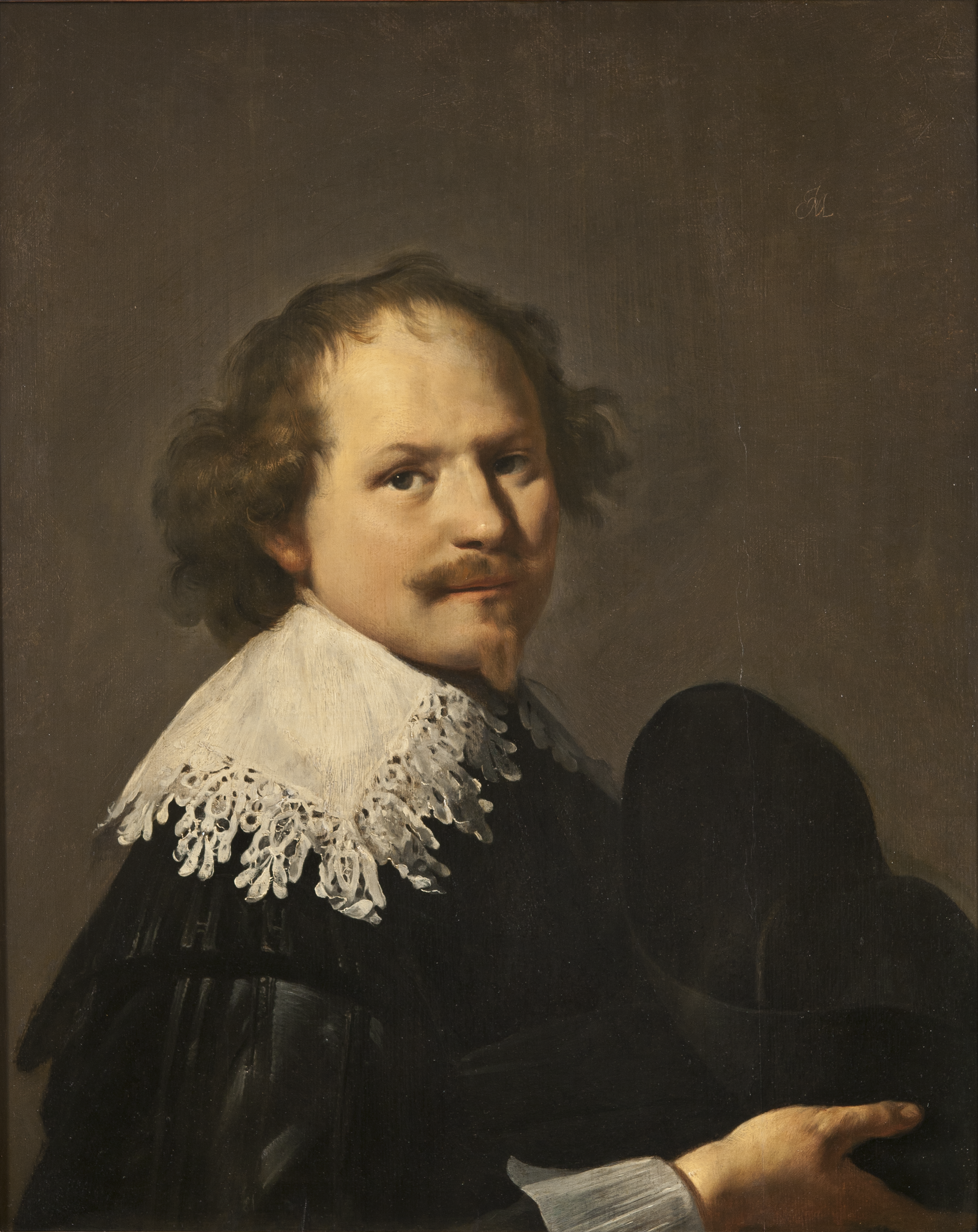
Portrait of a Man, unknown, Nationalmuseum, Stockholm, Sweden

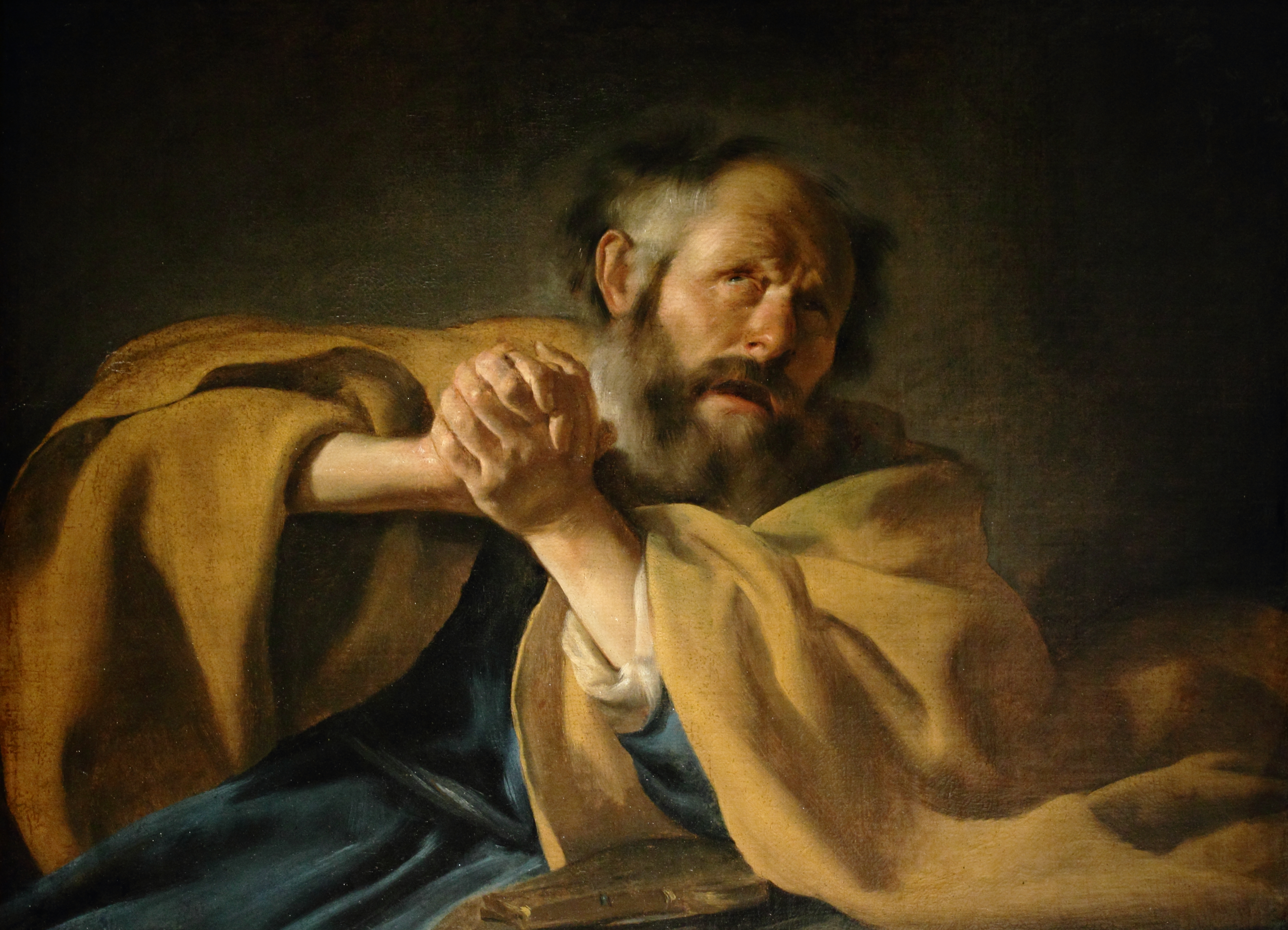
The Repentance of Saint Peter, c. 1630, Musée des Beaux-Arts et d'archéologie de Besançon, Besançon, France

== Bibliography ==
- B. Nicolson, Caravaggism in Europe, Oxford (1979), 2nd ed., dl. I, pp. 150–151
- J. A. Spicer [e.a.], cat. tent. Masters of Light. Dutch painters in Utrecht during the Golden Age, Baltimore (The Walkers Art Gallery), San Francisco (Fine Arts Museum), London (The National Gallery) (1997–1998), pp. 385–386
