= Logical pluralism =

Philosophical view that there is more than one correct logic

Logical pluralism also pluralistic logic and pluralistic logicism is the philosophical view that there is more than one correct logic. It stands in contrast to logical monism which argues that there is a single unique logic. There are different standards both for what counts as a logic and what exactly it means for a logic to be "correct", however, most debates about logical pluralism defined logic as a theory of validity. In other words, logic is the study of what constitutes a valid inference. Following from this definition, "correctness" has been defined in terms of whether or not a logic offers the correct form of valid inference. Logical pluralism holds that multiple different types of valid inference (i.e., at least two different consequence relations) can be correct.

Forms of logical pluralisms have been around since the first half of the 20th century, if not earlier. Perhaps most famous of these early models is found in the work of Rudolf Carnap.

Newfound interest in logical pluralism was sparked by the work of philosophers Jc Beall and Greg Restall, culminating in their 2006 book, Logical Pluralism.
