= Heraclitus and Democritus (Rubens) =

Painting by Peter Paul Rubens

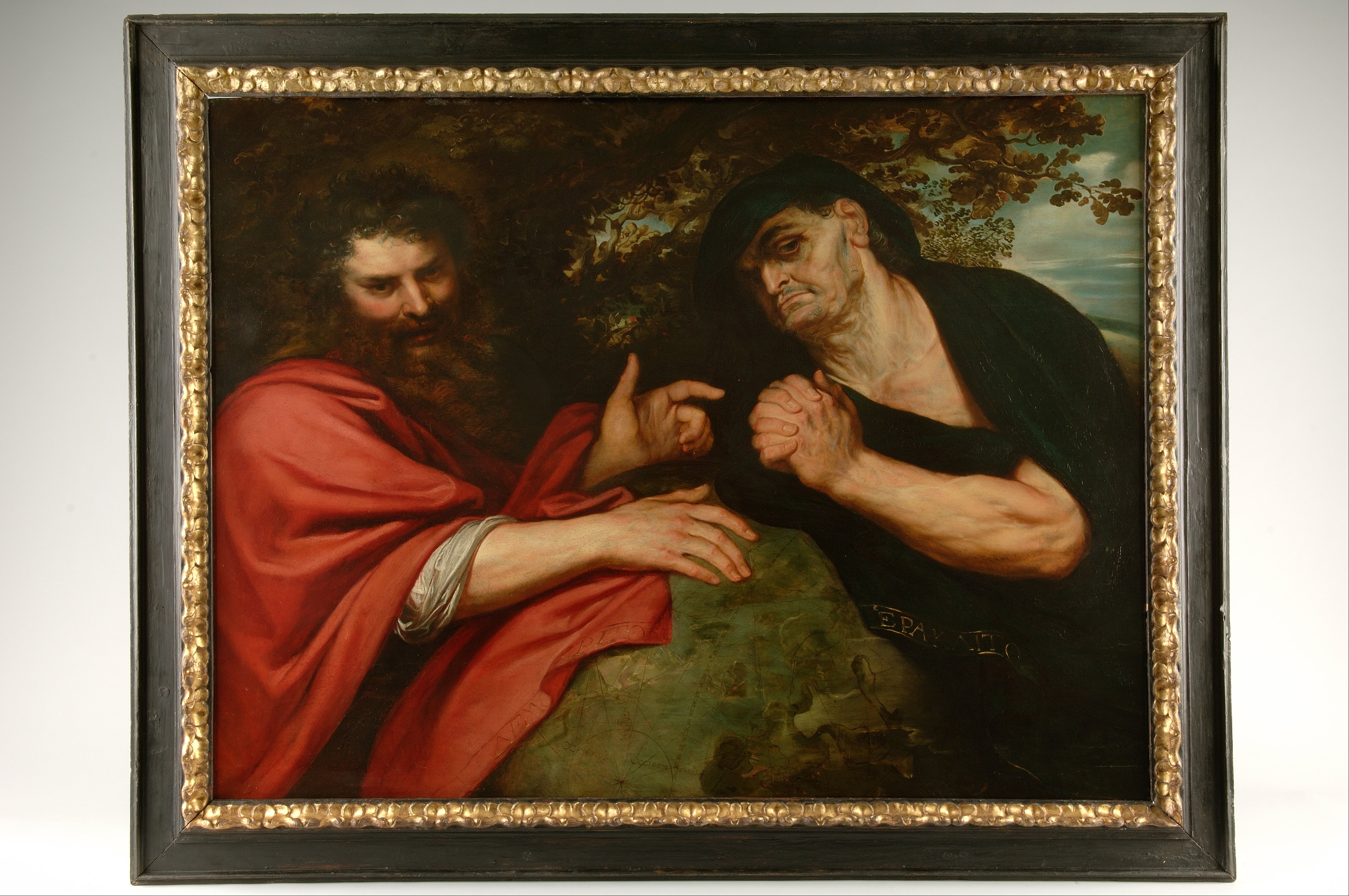
Heraclitus and Democritus (1603) by Rubens

Heraclitus and Democritus is a painting by the Flemish artist Peter Paul Rubens in 1603 in Valladolid during Rubens' stay in Spain for the Duke of Lerma . It is now held in the National Sculpture Museum in Valladolid. It shows the ancient Greek philosophers Heraclitus and Democritus.
