= Jc Beall =

American philosopher

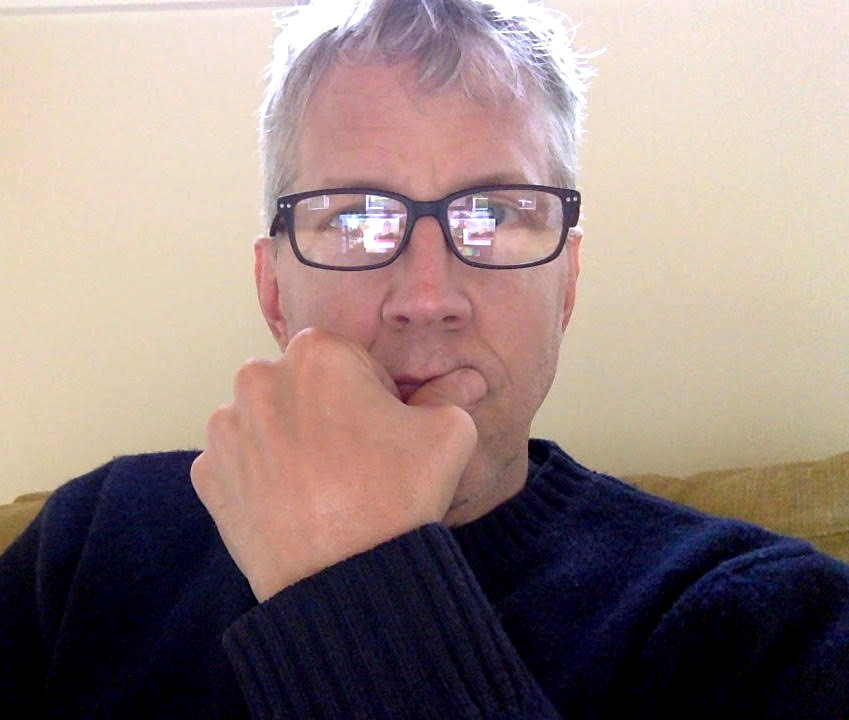
- Beall in 2017
- Born: 1966 (age 59–60); Portsmouth, New Hampshire

Education
- Education: Grove City College (BA); Princeton Theological Seminary (M.Div.); University of Massachusetts Amherst (Ph.D.)

Philosophical work
- Era: Contemporary philosophy
- Region: Western Philosophy
- School: Analytic philosophy
- Main interests: Logic, Philosophy of Logic, Analytic Theology
- Notable ideas: Dialetheism, Logical Pluralism, Contradictory Christology

Jc Beall is an American philosopher working in philosophy of logic and philosophical logic, who since 2020, holds the O’Neill Family Chair of Philosophy at the University of Notre Dame. He was previously the Board of Trustees Distinguished Professor of Philosophy at the University of Connecticut.

== Education and career ==
Beall earned a BA in philosophy from Grove City College. Beall earned his Ph. D. in philosophy from the University of Massachusetts, Amherst, and joined the faculty at the University of Connecticut as an assistant professor in 2000. He has also held part-time or visiting appointments at Yonsei University, University of Tasmania, University of Aberdeen, St Andrews University and University of Otago.

== Philosophical work ==
Beall is best known in philosophy for contributions to philosophical logic (particularly non-classical logic) and to the philosophy of logic. Beall, together with Greg Restall (an Australian logician and philosopher), is a pioneer of a widely discussed version of logical pluralism, according to which any given natural language has not one but many relations of logical consequence. Beall is also widely known for advocating a glut-theoretic account of deflationary truth (Spandrels of Truth (2009) (glut theory is the view that there are true contradictions, a special case of which is dialetheism).

Against the standard no-gap tradition in glut theory, Beall’s early and post-2013 work advocates a gluts-and-gaps account of language, advocating not only the existence of truth-value gluts but also of truth-value gaps. The adoption of both gaps and gluts distinguishes Beall from other researchers in a broadly glut-theoretic framework, who usually accept only gluts.
