= Greg Restall =

Australian philosopher

- Born: 11 January 1969 (age 57)
- Awards: Australian Academy of the Humanities fellowship

Education
- Education: University of Queensland
- Thesis: On Logics Without Contraction (1994)
- Doctoral advisor: Graham Priest

Philosophical work
- Era: 21st-century philosophy
- Region: Western philosophy
- School: Analytic
- Institutions: University of Melbourne, University of St Andrews
- Main interests: philosophy of language, logic
- Website: https://consequently.org/

Greg Restall (born 11 January 1969) is an Australian philosopher and Professor of Philosophy at the University of St Andrews. He is a fellow of the Australian Academy of the Humanities. Restall is known for his research on logic and theories of meaning. After working at the University of Melbourne for years he was appointed the Shelby Cullom David Professor of Philosophy at the University of St Andrews.

== Books ==
- An Introduction to Substructural Logics, Routledge, 2000
- Logic, Routledge, 2006
- Logical Pluralism, with Jc Beall, Oxford University Press, 2006
- Logical Methods, with Shawn Standefer, MIT Press, 2023

== See also ==
- Substructural logic
- Validity (logic)
- Logical harmony
- Relevance logic
