= Infinite-valued logic =

Many-valued logic in which truth values comprise a continuous range

In logic, an infinite-valued logic (or real-valued logic or infinitely-many-valued logic) is a many-valued logic in which truth values comprise a continuous range. Traditionally, in Aristotle's logic, logic other than bivalent logic was abnormal, as the law of the excluded middle precluded more than two possible values (i.e., "true" and "false") for any proposition. Modern three-valued logic (trivalent logic) allows for an additional possible truth value (i.e., "undecided") and is an example of finite-valued logic in which truth values are discrete, rather than continuous. Infinite-valued logic comprises continuous fuzzy logic, though fuzzy logic in some of its forms can further encompass finite-valued logic. For example, finite-valued logic can be applied in Boolean-valued modeling, description logics, and defuzzification of fuzzy logic.

== History ==
Isaac Newton and Gottfried Wilhelm Leibniz used both infinities and infinitesimals to develop the differential and integral calculus in the late 17th century. Richard Dedekind, who defined real numbers in terms of certain sets of rational numbers in the 19th century, also developed an axiom of continuity stating that a single correct value exists at the limit of any trial and error approximation. Felix Hausdorff demonstrated the logical possibility of an absolutely continuous ordering of words comprising bivalent values, each word having absolutely infinite length, in 1938. However, the definition of a random real number, meaning a real number that has no finite description whatsoever, remains somewhat in the realm of paradox.

Jan Łukasiewicz developed a system of three-valued logic in 1920. He generalized the system to many-valued logics in 1922 and went on to develop logics with $\aleph_0$ (infinite within a range) truth values. Kurt Gödel developed a deductive system, applicable for both finite- and infinite-valued first-order logic (a formal logic in which a predicate can refer to a single subject) as well as for intermediate logic (a formal intuitionistic logic usable to provide proofs such as a consistency proof for arithmetic), and showed in 1932 that logical intuition cannot be characterized by finite-valued logic.

The concept of expressing truth values as real numbers in the range between 0 and 1 can bring to mind the possibility of using complex numbers to express truth values. These truth values would have an imaginary dimension, for example between 0 and i. Two- or higher-dimensional truth could potentially be useful in systems of paraconsistent logic. If practical applications were to arise for such systems, multidimensional infinite-valued logic could develop as a concept independent of real-valued logic.

Lotfi A. Zadeh proposed a formal methodology of fuzzy logic and its applications in the early 1970s. By 1973, other researchers were applying the theory of Zadeh fuzzy controllers to various mechanical and industrial processes. The fuzzy modeling concept that evolved from this research was applied to neural networks in the 1980s and to machine learning in the 1990s. The formal methodology also led to generalizations of mathematical theories in the family of t-norm fuzzy logics.

== Examples ==
Basic fuzzy logic is the logic of continuous t-norms (binary operations on the real unit interval [0, 1]). Applications involving fuzzy logic include facial recognition systems, home appliances, anti-lock braking systems, automatic transmissions, controllers for rapid transit systems and unmanned aerial vehicles, knowledge-based and engineering optimization systems, weather forecasting, pricing, and risk assessment modeling systems, medical diagnosis and treatment planning, international trading systems, and more. Fuzzy logic is used to optimize efficiency in thermostats for control of heating and cooling, for industrial automation and process control, computer animation, signal processing, and data analysis. Fuzzy logic has made significant contributions in the fields of machine learning and data mining.

In infinitary logic, degrees of provability of propositions can be expressed in terms of infinite-valued logic that can be described via evaluated formulas, written as ordered pairs each consisting of a truth degree symbol and a formula.

In mathematics, number-free semantics can express facts about classical mathematical notions and make them derivable by logical deductions in infinite-valued logic. T-norm fuzzy logics can be applied to eliminate references to real numbers from definitions and theorems, in order to simplify certain mathematical concepts and facilitate certain generalizations. A framework employed for number-free formalization of mathematical concepts is known as fuzzy class theory.

Philosophical questions, including the Sorites paradox, have been considered based on an infinite-valued logic known as fuzzy epistemicism. The Sorites paradox suggests that if adding a grain of sand to something that is not a heap cannot create a heap, then a heap of sand cannot be created. A stepwise approach toward a limit, in which truth is gradually "leaked", tends to refute that suggestion.

In the study of logic itself, infinite-valued logic has served as an aid to understand the nature of the human understanding of logical concepts. Kurt Gödel attempted to comprehend the human ability for logical intuition in terms of finite-valued logic before concluding that the ability is based on infinite-valued logic. Open questions remain regarding the handling, in natural language semantics, of indeterminate truth values.

== See also ==
- Many-valued logic
- Finite-valued logic
- Intuitionistic logic
- Logical intuition
- Fuzzy logic
- Fuzzy number
- Construction of t-norms
- Set theory
