= Łukasiewicz–Moisil algebra =

Łukasiewicz–Moisil algebras (LM_{n} algebras) were introduced in the 1940s by Grigore Moisil (initially under the name of Łukasiewicz algebras) in the hope of giving algebraic semantics for the n-valued Łukasiewicz logic. However, in 1956 Alan Rose discovered that for n ≥ 5, the Łukasiewicz–Moisil algebra does not model the Łukasiewicz logic. A faithful model for the ℵ_{0}-valued (infinitely-many-valued) Łukasiewicz–Tarski logic was provided by C. C. Chang's MV-algebra, introduced in 1958. For the axiomatically more complicated (finite) n-valued Łukasiewicz logics, suitable algebras were published in 1977 by Revaz Grigolia and called MV_{n}-algebras. MV_{n}-algebras are a subclass of LM_{n}-algebras, and the inclusion is strict for n ≥ 5. In 1982 Roberto Cignoli published some additional constraints that added to LM_{n}-algebras produce proper models for n-valued Łukasiewicz logic; Cignoli called his discovery proper Łukasiewicz algebras.

Moisil however, published in 1964 a logic to match his algebra (in the general n ≥ 5 case), now called Moisil logic. After coming in contact with Zadeh's fuzzy logic, in 1968 Moisil also introduced an infinitely-many-valued logic variant and its corresponding LM_{θ} algebras. Although the Łukasiewicz implication cannot be defined in a LM_{n} algebra for n ≥ 5, the Heyting implication can be, i.e. LM_{n} algebras are Heyting algebras; as a result, Moisil logics can also be developed (from a purely logical standpoint) in the framework of Brower's intuitionistic logic.

== Definition ==
A LM_{n} algebra is a De Morgan algebra (a notion also introduced by Moisil) with n-1 additional unary, "modal" operations: $\nabla_1, \ldots, \nabla_{n-1}$, i.e. an algebra of signature $(A, \vee, \wedge, \neg, \nabla_{j \in J}, 0, 1)$ where J = { 1, 2, ... n-1 }. (Some sources denote the additional operators as $\nabla^n_{j \in J}$ to emphasize that they depend on the order n of the algebra.) The additional unary operators ∇_{j} must satisfy the following axioms for all x, y ∈ A and j, k ∈ J:

1. $\nabla_j(x \vee y) = (\nabla_j\; x) \vee (\nabla_j\; y)$
2. $\nabla_j\;x \vee \neg \nabla_j\;x = 1$
3. $\nabla_j (\nabla_k\;x) = \nabla_k\;x$
4. $\nabla_j \neg x = \neg \nabla_{n-j}\;x$
5. $\nabla_1\;x\leq \nabla_2\;x\cdots\leq \nabla_{n-1}\;x$
6. if $\nabla_j\;x = \nabla_j\;y$ for all j ∈ J, then x = y.

(The adjective "modal" is related to the [ultimately failed] program of Tarksi and Łukasiewicz to axiomatize modal logic using many-valued logic.)

== Elementary properties ==
The duals of some of the above axioms follow as properties:

- $\nabla_j(x \wedge y) = (\nabla_j\; x) \wedge (\nabla_j\; y)$
- $\nabla_j\;x \wedge \neg \nabla_j\;x = 0$

Additionally: $\nabla_j\;0 =0$ and $\nabla_j\;1 =1$. In other words, the unary "modal" operations $\nabla_j$ are lattice endomorphisms.

== Examples ==
LM_{2} algebras are the Boolean algebras. The canonical Łukasiewicz algebra $\mathcal{L}_n$ that Moisil had in mind were over the set $L_{n} = \{ 0,\ \frac{1} {n-1}, \frac{2} {n-1}, ... , \frac{n-2} {n-1}\ , 1 \}$ with negation $\neg x = 1-x$ conjunction $x \wedge y = \min\{x, y \}$ and disjunction $x \vee y = \max\{x, y \}$ and the unary "modal" operators:

$$\nabla_j\left(\frac{i}{n-1}\right)= \; \begin{cases}
0 & \mbox{if } i+j < n \\
1 & \mbox{if } i+j \geq n \\
\end{cases}
\quad i \in \{0\} \cup J,\; j \in J.$$

If B is a Boolean algebra, then the algebra over the set B^{[2]} ≝ {(x, y) ∈ B×B | x ≤ y} with the lattice operations defined pointwise and with ¬(x, y) ≝ (¬y, ¬x), and with the unary "modal" operators ∇_{2}(x, y) ≝ (y, y) and ∇_{1}(x, y) = ¬∇_{2}¬(x, y) = (x, x) [derived by axiom 4] is a three-valued Łukasiewicz algebra.

== Representation ==
Moisil proved that every LM_{n} algebra can be embedded in a direct product (of copies) of the canonical $\mathcal{L}_n$ algebra. As a corollary, every LM_{n} algebra is a subdirect product of subalgebras of $\mathcal{L}_n$.

The Heyting implication can be defined as:

$$x \Rightarrow y\; \overset{\mathrm{def}}{=}\;y \vee  \bigwedge_{j\in J}(\neg\nabla_j\;x) \vee (\nabla_j\;y)$$

Antonio Monteiro showed that for every monadic Boolean algebra one can construct a trivalent Łukasiewicz algebra (by taking certain equivalence classes) and that any trivalent Łukasiewicz algebra is isomorphic to a Łukasiewicz algebra thus derived from a monadic Boolean algebra. Cignoli summarizes the importance of this result as: "Since it was shown by Halmos that monadic Boolean algebras are the algebraic counterpart of classical first order monadic calculus, Monteiro considered that the representation of three-valued Łukasiewicz algebras into monadic Boolean algebras gives a proof of the consistency of Łukasiewicz three-valued logic relative to classical logic."
