= BCK =

BCK is the abbreviation of:

- Bahria College Karachi college in Karachi, Pakistan
- BC Kosher, a kosher certification agency in Canada
- BCK algebra, in mathematics, BCK or BCI algebras are algebraic structures
- British Rail coach type code representing a Brake composite corridor coach
- Buckley railway station, a railway station in the UK
- Buckie, a town in Scotland
- Compagnie du chemin de fer du bas-Congo au Katanga, former railway company in Congo
- 3-Methyl-2-oxobutanoate dehydrogenase (acetyl-transferring) kinase, an enzyme
