= Principle of bivalence =

Classical logic of two values, either true or false

In logic, the semantic principle (or law) of bivalence states that every declarative sentence expressing a proposition (of a theory under inspection) has exactly one truth value, either true or false. A logic satisfying this principle is called a two-valued logic or bivalent logic.

In formal logic, the principle of bivalence becomes a property that a semantics may or may not possess. It is not the same as the law of excluded middle, however, and a semantics may satisfy that law without being bivalent.

The principle of bivalence is studied in philosophical logic to address the question of which natural-language statements have a well-defined truth value. Sentences that predict events in the future, and sentences that seem open to interpretation, are particularly difficult for philosophers who hold that the principle of bivalence applies to all declarative natural-language statements. Many-valued logics formalize ideas that a realistic characterization of the notion of consequence requires the admissibility of premises that, owing to vagueness, temporal or quantum indeterminacy, or reference-failure, cannot be considered classically bivalent. Reference failures can also be addressed by free logics.

== Relationship to the law of the excluded middle ==
The principle of bivalence is related to the law of excluded middle though the latter is a syntactic expression of the language of a logic of the form "P ∨ ¬P". The difference between the principle of bivalence and the law of excluded middle is important because there are logics that validate the law but not the principle. For example, the three-valued Logic of Paradox (LP) validates the law of excluded middle, and yet also validates the law of non-contradiction, ¬(P ∧ ¬P), and its intended semantics is not bivalent. In intuitionistic logic the law of excluded middle does not hold. In classical two-valued logic both the law of excluded middle and the law of non-contradiction hold.

== Classical logic ==
The intended semantics of classical logic is bivalent, but this is not true of every semantics for classical logic. In Boolean-valued semantics (for classical propositional logic), the truth values are the elements of an arbitrary Boolean algebra, "true" corresponds to the maximal element of the algebra, and "false" corresponds to the minimal element. Intermediate elements of the algebra correspond to truth values other than "true" and "false". The principle of bivalence holds only when the Boolean algebra is taken to be the two-element algebra, which has no intermediate elements.

Assigning Boolean semantics to classical predicate calculus requires that the model be a complete Boolean algebra because the universal quantifier maps to the infimum operation, and the existential quantifier maps to the supremum; this is called a Boolean-valued model. All finite Boolean algebras are complete.

== Suszko's thesis ==
In order to justify his claim that true and false are the only logical values, Roman Suszko (1977) observes that every structural Tarskian many-valued propositional logic can be provided with a bivalent semantics.

== Criticisms ==
=== Future contingents ===
A famous example is the contingent sea battle case found in Aristotle's work, De Interpretatione, chapter 9:

Imagine P refers to the statement "There will be a sea battle tomorrow."

The principle of bivalence here asserts:

Either it is true that there will be a sea battle tomorrow, or it is false that there will be a sea battle tomorrow.

Aristotle denies to embrace bivalence for such future contingents; Chrysippus, the Stoic logician, did embrace bivalence for this and all other propositions. The controversy continues to be of central importance in both the philosophy of time and the philosophy of logic.

One of the early motivations for the study of many-valued logics has been precisely this issue. In the early 20th century, the Polish formal logician Jan Łukasiewicz proposed three truth-values: the true, the false and the as-yet-undetermined. This approach was later developed by Arend Heyting and L. E. J. Brouwer; see Łukasiewicz logic.

Issues such as this have also been addressed in various temporal logics, where one can assert that "Eventually, either there will be a sea battle tomorrow, or there won't be." (Which is true if "tomorrow" eventually occurs.)

=== Vagueness ===
Such puzzles as the Sorites paradox and the related continuum fallacy have raised doubt as to the applicability of classical logic and the principle of bivalence to concepts that may be vague in their application. Fuzzy logic and some other multi-valued logics have been proposed as alternatives that handle vague concepts better. Truth (and falsity) in fuzzy logic, for example, comes in varying degrees. Consider the following statement in the circumstance of sorting apples on a moving belt:

This apple is red.

Upon observation, the apple is an undetermined color between yellow and red, or it is mottled both colors. Thus the color falls into neither category " red " nor " yellow ", but these are the only categories available to us as we sort the apples. We might say it is "50% red". This could be rephrased: it is 50% true that the apple is red. Therefore, P is 50% true, and 50% false. Now consider:

This apple is red and it is not-red.

In other words, P and not-P. This violates the law of noncontradiction and, by extension, bivalence. However, this is only a partial rejection of these laws because P is only partially true. If P were 100% true, not-P would be 100% false, and there is no contradiction because P and not-P no longer holds.

However, the law of the excluded middle is retained, because P and not-P implies P or not-P, since "or" is inclusive. The only two cases where P and not-P is false (when P is 100% true or false) are the same cases considered by two-valued logic, and the same rules apply.

Example of a 3-valued logic applied to vague (undetermined) cases: Kleene 1952 (§64, pp. 332–340) offers a 3-valued logic for the cases when algorithms involving partial recursive functions may not return values, but rather end up with circumstances "u" = undecided. He lets "t" = "true", "f" = "false", "u" = "undecided" and redesigns all the propositional connectives. He observes that:

We were justified intuitionistically in using the classical 2-valued logic, when we were using the connectives in building primitive and general recursive predicates, since there is a decision procedure for each general recursive predicate; i.e. the law of the excluded middle is proved intuitionistically to apply to general recursive predicates.

Now if Q(x) is a partial recursive predicate, there is a decision procedure for Q(x) on its range of definition, so the law of the excluded middle or excluded "third" (saying that, Q(x) is either t or f) applies intuitionistically on the range of definition. But there may be no algorithm for deciding, given x, whether Q(x) is defined or not. [...] Hence it is only classically and not intuitionistically that we have a law of the excluded fourth (saying that, for each x, Q(x) is either t, f, or u).

The third "truth value" u is thus not on par with the other two t and f in our theory. Consideration of its status will show that we are limited to a special kind of truth table".

The following are his "strong tables":

~Q			QVR	R	t	f	u	Q&R	R	t	f	u	Q→R	R	t	f	u	Q=R	R	t	f	u
Q	t	f	Q	t	t	t	t	Q	t	t	f	u	Q	t	t	f	u	Q	t	t	f	u
	f	t		f	t	f	u		f	f	f	f		f	t	t	t		f	f	t	u
	u	u		u	t	u	u		u	u	f	u		u	t	u	u		u	u	u	u

For example, if a determination cannot be made as to whether an apple is red or not-red, then the truth value of the assertion Q: " This apple is red " is " u ". Likewise, the truth value of the assertion R " This apple is not-red " is " u ". Thus the AND of these into the assertion Q AND R, i.e. " This apple is red AND this apple is not-red " will, per the tables, yield " u ". And, the assertion Q OR R, i.e. " This apple is red OR this apple is not-red " will likewise yield " u ".

=== Self-referential statements ===
Some self-referential statements like the one featured in the liar's paradox can not be assigned definite truth values of neither "True" nor "False" without running into contradictions. The liar paradox can be stated as:

A: This statement (A) is false.

If (A) is true, then "This statement is false" is true. Therefore, (A) must be false. The hypothesis that (A) is true leads to the conclusion that (A) is false, a contradiction.

If (A) is false, then "This statement is false" is false. Therefore, (A) must be true. The hypothesis that (A) is false leads to the conclusion that (A) is true, another contradiction. Either way, (A) is both true and false, which is a paradox.

Some possible resolutions of this paradox include the rejection of Boolean logic (and thus the principle of bivalence) and its replacement with any many-valued logic like fuzzy logic, in which the truth value of a statement may be any real number between 0 (denoting "Falsehood") and 1 (denoting "Truth").

== See also ==
- Dualism
- Exclusive disjunction
- Degrees of truth
- Anekantavada
- Extensionality
- False dilemma
- Fuzzy logic
- Liar paradox
- Logical disjunction
- Logical equality
- Logical value
- Multi-valued logic
- Perspectivism
- Propositional logic
- Quantum logic
- Relativism
- Self-reference
- Supervaluationism
- True and false
- Truthbearer
- Truthmaker
- Truth-value link
