= Grigore Moisil =

Romanian mathematician

Grigore C. Moisil
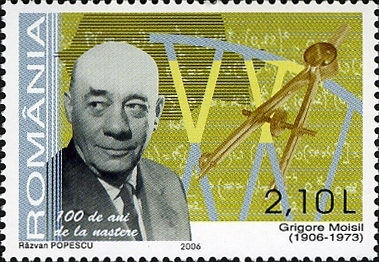
- Grigore Moisil on a 2006 Romanian stamp
- Born: 10 January 1906; Tulcea, Kingdom of Romania
- Died: May 21, 1973 (aged 67); Ottawa, Ontario, Canada
- Citizenship: Romania
- Education: Polytechnic University of Bucharest
- Known for: Łukasiewicz–Moisil algebra Algebraic logic MV-algebra
- Scientific career
- Fields: Mathematics, logic, and mathematical logic
- Workplaces: University of Bucharest
- Thesis: La mécanique analytique des systemes continus (1929)
- Doctoral advisors: Gheorghe Țițeica; Dimitrie Pompeiu
- Doctoral students: Peter L. Hammer

Grigore Constantin Moisil (Romanian: [ɡriˈɡore mo.iˈsil]; 10 January 1906 – 21 May 1973) was a Romanian mathematician, computer pioneer, and titular member of the Romanian Academy. His research was mainly in the fields of mathematical logic (Łukasiewicz–Moisil algebra), algebraic logic, MV-algebra, and differential equations. He is viewed as the father of computer science in Romania.

Moisil was also a member of the Academy of Sciences of Bologna and of the International Institute of Philosophy. In 1996, the IEEE Computer Society awarded him posthumously the Computer Pioneer Award.

== Biography ==
Grigore Moisil was born in 1906 in Tulcea into an intellectual family. His great-grandfather, Grigore Moisil (1814–1891), a clergyman, was one of the founders of the first Romanian high school in Năsăud. His father, Constantin Moisil (1876–1958), was a history professor, archaeologist and numismatist; as a member of the Romanian Academy, he filled the position of Director of the Numismatics Office of the Academy. His mother, Elena (1863–1949), was a teacher in Tulcea, later the director of "Maidanul Dulapului" school in Bucharest (now "Ienăchiță Văcărescu" school).

Grigore Moisil attended primary school in Bucharest, then high school in Vaslui and Bucharest (at Spiru Haret High School) between 1916 and 1922. In 1924 he was admitted to the Civil Engineering School of the Polytechnic University of Bucharest, and also the Mathematics School of the University of Bucharest. He showed a stronger interest in mathematics, so he quit the Polytechnic University in 1929, despite already having passed all the third-year exams. In 1929 he defended his Ph.D. thesis, La mécanique analytique des systemes continus (Analytical mechanics of continuous systems), before a commission led by Gheorghe Țițeica, with Dimitrie Pompeiu and Anton Davidoglu as members. The thesis was published the same year by the Gauthier-Villars publishing house in Paris, and received favourable comments from Vito Volterra, Tullio Levi-Civita, and Paul Lévy.

In 1930 Moisil went to the University of Paris for further study in mathematics, which he finalized the next year with the paper On a class of systems of equations with partial derivatives from mathematical physics. In 1931 he returned to Romania, where he was appointed in a teaching position at the Mathematics School of the University of Iași. Shortly after, he left for a one-year Rockefeller Foundation scholarship to study in Rome. In 1932 he returned to Iași, where he remained for almost 10 years, developing a close relationship with professor Alexandru Myller. He taught the first modern algebra course in Romania, named Logic and theory of proof, at the University of Iași. During that time, he started writing a series of papers based on the works of Jan Łukasiewicz in multi-valued logic. His research in mathematical logic laid the foundation for significant work done afterwards in Romania, as well as Argentina, Yugoslavia, Czechoslovakia, and Hungary. While in Iași, he completed research remarkable for the many new ideas and for his way of finding and using new connections between concepts from different areas of mathematics. He was promoted to Full Professor in November 1939.

In 1941, a position of professor at the University of Bucharest opened up, and Moisil applied for it. However, Gheorghe Vrânceanu, Dan Barbilian, and Miron Nicolescu also applied for the position, and Vrânceanu got it. Moisil approached the Ministry of Education, arguing that it would be a great opportunity for mathematics in Romania if all four could be appointed. As a result of his appeal, all four mathematicians were hired. Moisil moved to Bucharest, where he became a Professor in the School of Mathematics (later the School of Mathematics and Computer Science) at the University of Bucharest, on 30 December 1941.

From 1946 to 1948, Moisil took a leave of absence, being named plenipotentiary envoy to Ankara. While in Turkey, he gave several series of mathematics lectures at Istanbul University and Istanbul Technical University.

In 1948, he resumed teaching at the University of Bucharest. That same year, he was elected to the Romanian Academy, and a member of the Institute of Mathematics of the Romanian Academy. After 1965, one of his students, George Georgescu, worked closely with him on multi-valued logics, and after the Romanian Revolution of 1989, became a Professor of Mathematics and Logic at the same university and department as Moisil in 1991. His student also published extensive, original work on algebraic logic, MV-algebra, algebra, algebraic topology, categories of MV-algebras, category theory and Łukasiewicz–Moisil algebra.

== Work ==
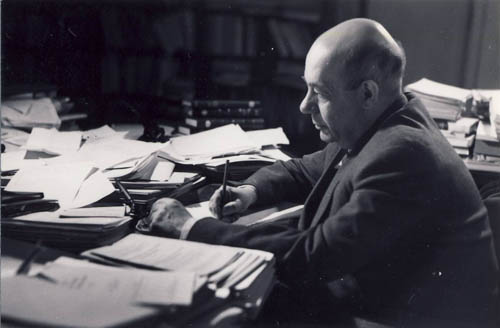
Moisil at his desk

Moisil published papers on mechanics, mathematical analysis, geometry, algebra and mathematical logic. He developed a multi-dimensional extension of Pompeiu's areolar derivative, and studied monogenic functions of one hypercomplex variable with applications to mechanics. Moisil also introduced some many-valued algebras, which he called Łukasiewicz algebras (now also named Łukasiewicz–Moisil algebras), and used them in logic and the study of automata theory. He created new methods to analyze finite automata, and had many contributions to the field of automata theory in algebra.

Whereas Moisil's early contributions were in mathematics, he later devoted his scientific activity to mathematical logic and computer science. He was a professor of mathematical logic and computer science at the University of Bucharest, and he also taught Boolean logic at the Politehnica University of Bucharest. In 1957 he assisted in setting up the first Romanian computer in the Institute of Atomic Physics, and he encouraged several of his students to learn computer programming. Thus, he played a fundamental role in the development of computer science in Romania, and in raising the first generations of Romanian computer scientists. Furthermore, several of Moisil’s books had an impact on the beginning of computer science: Încercări Vechi și Noi în Logica Neoclasică [New and Old Approaches in Neoclassic Logic], 1953; Teoria Algebrică a Mecanismelor Automate [Algebraic Theory of Automata], 1959; and Circuite cu Tranzistori [Transistorized Circuits], 1961. These books were translated into several languages, including Russian and Czech. He furthermore gave lectures at various universities in Europe and North America.

Moisil was a titular member of the Romanian Academy and a member of the Academy of Bologna. In 1996, he was awarded by exception posthumously the Computer Pioneer Award by the Institute of Electrical and Electronics Engineers Computer Society.

== See also ==
- Boolean logic
- De Morgan algebra
- Jan Łukasiewicz

Łukasiewicz logic

- Ternary logic
- Lattices
- Multi-valued logic:

Łukasiewicz–Moisil algebras

- Quantum logic:

Quantum computers

- Algebraic logic:

MV-algebra

- Symbolic logic:

Mathematical logic

- Algebra
- Category theory:

Categorical logic, Adjoint functors

- Institute of Electrical and Electronics Engineers

== Notes ==
=== Selected publications ===
- Logique modale, Disquisit. Math. Phys. 2 (1942), 3–98. MR 0020524
- Introducere in algebră. I. Inele și ideale [Introduction to algebra. I. Rings and ideals], Editura Academiei Republicii Popular Române, Bucharest, 1954. MR 0069136
- Teoria algebrică a mecanismelor automate [Algebraic theory of automatic machines], Academia Republicii Popular Romîne, Editura Tehnică, Bucharest, 1959. MR 0120120
- Circuite cu tranzistori [Transistor Circuits], Editura Academiei Republicii Popular Romîne, Bucharest, 1961–62. OCLC 15371418
- Théorie structurelle des automates finis, Gauthier-Villars, Paris, 1967. OCLC 9049760
- The algebraic theory of switching circuits, Pergamon Press, Oxford, New York, 1969. ISBN 0-08-010148-8

== Books and articles on Moisil ==
- George Georgescu, Afrodita Iorgulescu, Sergiu Rudeanu, "Grigore C. Moisil (1906–1973) and his School in Algebraic Logic", International Journal of Computers, Communications & Control, vol. 1 (2006), no.1, 81–99.
- Solomon Marcus, "Grigore C. Moisil: A life becoming a myth", International Journal of Computers, Communications & Control, vol. 1 (2006), no. 1, 73–79.
- Viorica Moisil, "Once upon a time... Grigore Moisil" (A fost odată... Grigore Moisil), Bucharest: Curtea Veche, 2002. ISBN 973-8356-09-1
- Sergiu Rudeanu, Afrodita Iorgulescu, George Georgescu and Cătălin Ioniţă, "G. C. Moisil memorial issue", Multiple-Valued Logic 6 (2001), no. 1-2. Gordon and Breach, Yverdon, 2001. MR 1817431
