= Cantor algebra =

In mathematics, a Cantor algebra, named after Georg Cantor, is one of two closely related Boolean algebras, one countable and one complete.

The countable Cantor algebra is the Boolean algebra of all clopen subsets of the Cantor set. This is the free Boolean algebra on a countable number of generators. Up to isomorphism, this is the only nontrivial Boolean algebra that is both countable and atomless.

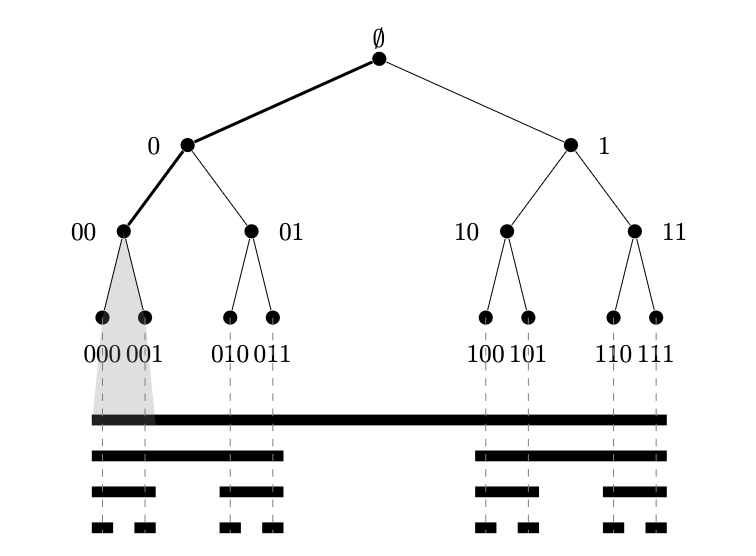
The cylinder set $C_{00}$ in the Cantor algebra.

The complete Cantor algebra is the complete Boolean algebra of Borel subsets of the reals modulo meager sets (Balcar & Jech 2006). It is isomorphic to the completion of the countable Cantor algebra. (The complete Cantor algebra is sometimes called the Cohen algebra, though "Cohen algebra" usually refers to a different type of Boolean algebra.) The complete Cantor algebra was studied by von Neumann in 1935 (later published as (von Neumann 1998)), who showed that it is not isomorphic to the random algebra of Borel subsets modulo measure zero sets.
