= Finite-valued logic =

Logic with discrete truth values

In logic, a finite-valued logic (also finitely many-valued logic) is a propositional calculus in which truth values are discrete. Traditionally, in Aristotle's logic, the bivalent logic, also known as binary logic was the norm, as the law of the excluded middle precluded more than two possible values (i.e., "true" and "false") for any proposition. Modern three-valued logic (ternary logic) allows for an additional possible truth value (i.e. "undecided").

The term finitely many-valued logic is typically used to describe many-valued logic having three or more, but not infinite, truth values. The term finite-valued logic encompasses both finitely many-valued logic and bivalent logic. Fuzzy logics, which allow for degrees of values between "true" and "false", are typically not considered forms of finite-valued logic. However, finite-valued logic can be applied in Boolean-valued modeling, description logics, and defuzzification of fuzzy logic. A finite-valued logic is decidable (sure to determine outcomes of the logic when it is applied to propositions) if and only if it has a computational semantics.

== History ==
Aristotle's collected works regarding logic, known as the Organon, describe bivalent logic primarily, though Aristotle's views may have allowed for propositions that are not actually true or false. The Organon influenced philosophers and mathematicians throughout the Enlightenment. George Boole developed an algebraic structure and an algorithmic probability theory based on bivalent logic in the 19th century.

Jan Łukasiewicz developed a system of three-valued logic in 1920. Emil Leon Post introduced further truth degrees in 1921.

Stephen Cole Kleene and Ulrich Blau expanded the three-valued logic system of Łukasiewicz, for computer applications and for natural language analyses, respectively. Nuel Belnap and J. Michael Dunn developed a four-valued logic for computer applications in 1977. Since the mid-1970s, various procedures for providing arbitrary finite-valued logics have been developed.

== Examples ==
In linguistics, finite-valued logic is used to treat presuppositions as product systems with ordered pairs of truth degrees, or truth tables. This enables assumptions built into verbal or written statements to be associated with varying degrees of truth values in the course of natural-language processing.

In the study of formal languages, finite-valued logic has shown that encapsulating a truth predicate in a language can render the language inconsistent. Saul Kripke has built on work pioneered by Alfred Tarski to demonstrate that such a truth predicate can be modeled using three-valued logic.

Philosophical questions, including the Sorites paradox, have been considered based on a finite-valued logic known as fuzzy plurivaluationism. The Sorites paradox suggests that if adding a grain of sand to something that is not a heap cannot create a heap, then a heap of sand cannot be created. A logical model of a heap in which there are as many truth degrees as grains of sand tends to refute that suggestion.

In electronics design, a logical model of the stable states of a circuit, in which there are as many truth degrees as there are states, serves as a model for finite-valued switching. Three-valued operators can be realized in integrated circuits.

In fuzzy logic, typically applied for approximate reasoning, a finitely-valued logic can represent propositions that may acquire values within a finite set.

In mathematics, logical matrices having multiple truth degrees are used to model systems of axioms.

Biophysical indications suggest that in the brain, synaptic charge injections occur in finite steps, and that neuron arrangements can be modeled based on the probability distribution of a finitely valued random variable.

In the study of logic itself, finite-valued logic has served as an aid to understand the nature and existence of infinite-valued logic. Kurt Gödel attempted to comprehend the human ability for logical intuition in terms of finite-valued logic before concluding that the ability is based on infinite-valued logic.

== See also ==
- Many-valued logic
- Infinite-valued logic
- Set theory
