= Complete Boolean algebra =

Boolean algebra with all operators and laws forming a complete logical system

In mathematics, a complete Boolean algebra is a Boolean algebra in which every subset has a supremum (least upper bound). Complete Boolean algebras are used to construct Boolean-valued models of set theory in the theory of forcing. Every Boolean algebra A has an essentially unique completion, which is a complete Boolean algebra containing A such that every element is the supremum of some subset of A. As a partially ordered set, this completion of A is the Dedekind–MacNeille completion.

More generally, for some cardinal κ, a Boolean algebra is called κ-complete if every subset of cardinality less than or equal to κ has a supremum.

== Examples ==
=== Complete Boolean algebras ===
- Every finite Boolean algebra is complete.
- The algebra of subsets of a given set is a complete Boolean algebra.
- The regular open sets of any topological space form a complete Boolean algebra. This example is of particular importance because every forcing poset can be considered as a topological space (a base for the topology consisting of sets that are the set of all elements less than or equal to a given element). The corresponding regular open algebra can be used to form Boolean-valued models which are then equivalent to generic extensions by the given forcing poset.
- The algebra of all measurable subsets of a σ-finite measure space, modulo null sets, is a complete Boolean algebra. When the measure space is the unit interval with the σ-algebra of Lebesgue measurable sets, the Boolean algebra is called the random algebra.
- The Boolean algebra of all Baire sets modulo meager sets in a topological space with a countable base is complete; when the topological space is the real numbers the algebra is sometimes called the Cantor algebra.

=== Non-complete Boolean algebras ===
- The algebra of all subsets of an infinite set that are finite or have finite complement is a Boolean algebra but is not complete.
- The algebra of all measurable subsets of a measure space is a ℵ_{1}-complete Boolean algebra, but is not usually complete.
- Another example of a Boolean algebra that is not complete is the Boolean algebra P(ω) of all sets of natural numbers, quotiented out by the ideal Fin of finite subsets. The resulting object, denoted P(ω)/Fin, consists of all equivalence classes of sets of naturals, where the relevant equivalence relation is that two sets of naturals are equivalent if their symmetric difference is finite. The Boolean operations are defined analogously, for example, if A and B are two equivalence classes in P(ω)/Fin, we define $A \land B$ to be the equivalence class of $a \cap b$, where a and b are some (any) elements of A and B respectively.

Now let a_{0}, a_{1}, ... be pairwise disjoint infinite sets of naturals, and let A_{0}, A_{1}, ... be their corresponding equivalence classes in P(ω)/Fin. Then given any upper bound X of A_{0}, A_{1}, ... in P(ω)/Fin, we can find a lesser upper bound, by removing from a representative for X one element of each a_{n}. Therefore the A_{n} have no supremum.

== Properties of complete Boolean algebras ==
- Every subset of a complete Boolean algebra has a supremum, by definition; it follows that every subset also has an infimum (greatest lower bound).
- For a complete Boolean algebra, both infinite distributive laws hold if and only if it is isomorphic to a complete field of sets (For example, the power set of some set).
- For a complete Boolean algebra infinite de-Morgan's laws hold.
- A Boolean algebra is complete if and only if its Stone space of prime ideals is extremally disconnected.
- Sikorski's extension theorem states that if A is a subalgebra of a Boolean algebra B, then any homomorphism from A to a complete Boolean algebra C can be extended to a morphism from B to C.

== The completion of a Boolean algebra ==
The completion of a Boolean algebra can be defined in several equivalent ways:

- The completion of A is (up to isomorphism) the unique complete Boolean algebra B containing A such that A is dense in B; this means that for every nonzero element of B there is a smaller non-zero element of A.
- The completion of A is (up to isomorphism) the unique complete Boolean algebra B containing A such that every element of B is the supremum of some subset of A.

The completion of a Boolean algebra A can be constructed in several ways:

- The completion is the Boolean algebra of regular open sets in the Stone space of prime ideals of A. Each element x of A corresponds to the open set of prime ideals not containing x (which is open and closed, and therefore regular).
- The completion is the Boolean algebra of regular cuts of A. Here a cut is a subset U of A^{+} (the non-zero elements of A) such that if q is in U and p ≤ q then p is in U, and is called regular if whenever p is not in U there is some r ≤ p such that U has no elements ≤ r. Each element p of A corresponds to the cut of elements ≤ p.

If A is a metric space and B its completion then any isometry from A to a complete metric space C can be extended to a unique isometry from B to C. The analogous statement for complete Boolean algebras is not true: a homomorphism from a Boolean algebra A to a complete Boolean algebra C cannot necessarily be extended to a (supremum preserving) homomorphism of complete Boolean algebras from the completion B of A to C. (By Sikorski's extension theorem it can be extended to a homomorphism of Boolean algebras from B to C, but this will not in general be a homomorphism of complete Boolean algebras; in other words, it need not preserve suprema.)

== Free κ-complete Boolean algebras ==
Unless the Axiom of Choice is relaxed, free complete boolean algebras generated by a set do not exist (unless the set is finite). More precisely, for any cardinal κ, there is a complete Boolean algebra of cardinality 2^{κ} greater than κ that is generated as a complete Boolean algebra by a countable subset; for example the Boolean algebra of regular open sets in the product space κ^{ω}, where κ has the discrete topology. A countable generating set consists of all sets a_{m,n} for m, n integers, consisting of the elements x ∊ κ^{ω} such that x(m) < x(n). (This boolean algebra is called a collapsing algebra, because forcing with it collapses the cardinal κ onto ω.)

In particular the forgetful functor from complete Boolean algebras to sets has no left adjoint, even though it is continuous and the category of Boolean algebras is small-complete. This shows that the "solution set condition" in Freyd's adjoint functor theorem is necessary.

Given a set X, one can form the free Boolean algebra A generated by this set and then take its completion B. However B is not a "free" complete Boolean algebra generated by X (unless X is finite or AC is omitted), because a function from X to a free Boolean algebra C cannot in general be extended to a (supremum-preserving) morphism of Boolean algebras from B to C.

On the other hand, for any fixed cardinal κ, there is a free (or universal) κ-complete Boolean algebra generated by any given set.

== See also ==
- Complete lattice
- Complete Heyting algebra
- Pointless topology

== Literature ==
- Johnstone, Peter T. (1982). Stone spaces. Cambridge University Press. ISBN 0-521-33779-8.
- Koppelberg, Sabine (1989). Monk, J. Donald; Bonnet, Robert (eds.). Handbook of Boolean algebras. Vol. 1. Amsterdam: North-Holland Publishing Co. pp. xx+312. ISBN 0-444-70261-X. MR 0991565.
- Monk, J. Donald; Bonnet, Robert, eds. (1989). Handbook of Boolean algebras. Vol. 2. Amsterdam: North-Holland Publishing Co. ISBN 0-444-87152-7. MR 0991595.
- Monk, J. Donald; Bonnet, Robert, eds. (1989). Handbook of Boolean algebras. Vol. 3. Amsterdam: North-Holland Publishing Co. ISBN 0-444-87153-5. MR 0991607.
- Stavi, Jonathan (1974). "A model of ZF with an infinite free complete Boolean algebra". Israel Journal of Mathematics. 20 (2): 149–163. doi:10.1007/BF02757883. S2CID 119543439.
- Vladimirov, D.A. (2001) [1994], "Boolean algebra", Encyclopedia of Mathematics, EMS Press
