= Gödel logic =

In mathematical logic, Gödel logics, sometimes referred to as Dummett logics or Gödel–Dummett logics, is a family of finite- or infinite-valued logics in which the sets of truth values V are closed subsets of the unit interval [0,1] containing both 0 and 1. Different such sets V in general determine different Gödel logics.

Gödel logics have several alternative definitions. Specifically, Gödel logics are:

- logics of linearly-ordered Heyting algebras
- logics of (classes of) linearly ordered and countable intuitionistic Kripke structures with constant domains
- logics of relative comparison, in contrast to Łukasiewicz logic, which is a logic of absolute comparison or metric comparison

The concept is named after Kurt Gödel and Michael Dummett.

== Semantics ==
=== Propositional ===
Given a propositional Gödel logic, an interpretation of it is defined as follows:

- Each propositional variable $p$ is assigned a truth value $I[p] \in V$.
- $I[A \or B] = \max (I[A], I[B])$.
- $I[A \and B] = \min (I[A], I[B])$.
- $$I[A \to B] = \begin{cases}
1 & \text{ if } I[A] \leq I[B],\\
I[B] & \text{ if } I[A] > I[B]
\end{cases}$$
- $I[\bot] = 0$
- $$I [\neg A] := I[A \to \bot] = \begin{cases}
1 & \text{ if } I[A] = 0,\\
0 & \text{ else.}
\end{cases}$$
- $I [\top] := I[\neg\bot] := I[\bot \to \bot] = 1$

For this logic, there is usually also another unary logical connective $\Delta$, such that a model of it must satisfy
$$I(\Delta A) = \begin{cases}
1 & \text{ if } I[A] = 1,\\
0 & \text{ else.}
\end{cases}$$
and a binary logical connective $\prec$ defined by $A\prec B := (B \to A) \to B$, which implies
$$I[A \prec B] = \begin{cases}
1 & \text{ if } I[A] < I[B],\\
I[B] & \text{ if } I[A] \geq I[B]
\end{cases}$$
Note that for this, we do not need $V$ to be a closed set, only that $V$ contain $0, 1$.

=== First-order ===
Given a first-order logic, it corresponds to a first-order Gödel logic. An interpretation of it is defined essentially the same as the first-order logic:

- There is a nonempty set $M$, the universe of the interpretation.
- For each variable symbol $v$, there is an element $v^I \in M$.
- For each k-ary function symbol $f$, there is a function $f^I: M^k \to M$.
- For each k-ary relation symbol $R$, there is a function $R^I: M^k \to V$.
- For each term $f(t_1, \dots, t_k)$, its interpretation is $f(t_1, \dots, t_k)^I := f^I(t_1^I , \dots, t_k^I)$.
- For each atomic formula $R(t_1, \dots, t_k)$, its interpreted truth value is $I(R(t_1, \dots, t_k)) := R^I(t_1^I , \dots, t_k^I)$.
- The propositional logic connectives works the same as before.
- For each $\forall x, A$, its interpreted truth value is $I(\forall x, A) := \inf_{m \in M} I[m/x] (A)$, where $I[m/x]$ is defined as the interpretation generated by setting $x^I$ to $m$ instead.
- For each $\exists x, A$, its interpreted truth value is $I(\exists x, A) := \sup_{m \in M} I[m/x] (A)$,

Note that for this, we do need $V$ to be a closed set, since otherwise the quantified formulas is not guaranteed to have a truth value.

=== Entailment ===
For any set $\Gamma$ of formulas, and any interpretation $I$, define $I(\Gamma) := \inf_{A \in \Gamma} I(A)$, with the special case that $I(\emptyset) = 1$.

We say that $\Gamma \models_V A$ iff for any interpretation $I$ into $V$, $I(\Gamma) \leq I(A)$. In particular, $\models_V A$ iff for any interpretation $I$ into $V$, $I(A) = 1$.

== Syntax ==
In 1959, Michael Dummett showed that infinite-valued propositional Gödel logic can be axiomatised by adding the axiom schema

$$(A \rightarrow B) \lor (B \rightarrow A)$$

to intuitionistic propositional logic.

== See also ==
- Intermediate logic
