= MV-algebra =

Algebraic structure providing a semantics of Łukasiewicz logic

In abstract algebra, a branch of pure mathematics, an MV-algebra is an algebraic structure with a binary operation $\oplus$, a unary operation $\neg$, and the constant $0$, satisfying certain axioms. MV-algebras are the algebraic semantics of Łukasiewicz logic; the letters MV refer to the many-valued logic of Łukasiewicz. MV-algebras coincide with the class of bounded commutative BCK algebras.

== Definitions ==
An MV-algebra is an algebraic structure $\langle A, \oplus, \lnot, 0\rangle,$ consisting of

- a non-empty set $A,$
- a binary operation $\oplus$ on $A,$
- a unary operation $\lnot$ on $A,$ and
- a constant $0$ denoting a fixed element of $A,$

which satisfies the following identities:

- $(x \oplus y) \oplus z = x \oplus (y \oplus z),$
- $x \oplus 0 = x,$
- $x \oplus y = y \oplus x,$
- $\lnot \lnot x = x,$
- $x \oplus \lnot 0 = \lnot 0,$ and
- $\lnot ( \lnot x \oplus y)\oplus y = \lnot ( \lnot y \oplus x) \oplus x.$

By virtue of the first three axioms, $\langle A, \oplus, 0 \rangle$ is a commutative monoid. Being defined by identities, MV-algebras form a variety of algebras. The variety of MV-algebras is a subvariety of the variety of BL-algebras and contains all Boolean algebras.

An MV-algebra can equivalently be defined (Hájek 1998) as a prelinear commutative bounded integral residuated lattice $\langle L, \wedge, \vee, \otimes, \rightarrow, 0, 1 \rangle$ satisfying the additional identity $x \vee y = (x \rightarrow y) \rightarrow y.$

== Examples of MV-algebras ==
A simple numerical example is $A=[0,1],$ with operations $x \oplus y = \min(x + y, 1)$ and $\lnot x = 1 - x.$ In mathematical fuzzy logic, this MV-algebra is called the standard MV-algebra, as it forms the standard real-valued semantics of Łukasiewicz logic.

The trivial MV-algebra has the only element 0 and the operations defined in the only possible way, $0\oplus0=0$ and $\lnot0=0.$

The two-element MV-algebra is actually the two-element Boolean algebra $\{0,1\},$ with $\oplus$ coinciding with Boolean disjunction and $\lnot$ with Boolean negation. In fact adding the axiom $x \oplus x = x$ to the axioms defining an MV-algebra results in an axiomatization of Boolean algebras.

If instead the axiom added is $x \oplus x \oplus x = x \oplus x$, then the axioms define the MV_{3} algebra corresponding to the three-valued Łukasiewicz logic Ł_{3}. Other finite linearly ordered MV-algebras are obtained by restricting the universe and operations of the standard MV-algebra to the set of $n$ equidistant real numbers between 0 and 1 (both included), that is, the set $\{0,1/(n-1),2/(n-1),\dots,1\},$ which is closed under the operations $\oplus$ and $\lnot$ of the standard MV-algebra; these algebras are usually denoted MV_{n}.

Another important example is Chang's MV-algebra, consisting just of infinitesimals (with the order type ω) and their co-infinitesimals.

Chang also constructed an MV-algebra from an arbitrary totally ordered abelian group G by fixing a positive element u and defining the segment [0, u] as { x ∈ G | 0 ≤ x ≤ u }, which becomes an MV-algebra with x ⊕ y = min(u, x + y) and ¬x = u − x. Furthermore, Chang showed that every linearly ordered MV-algebra is isomorphic to an MV-algebra constructed from a group in this way.

Daniele Mundici extended the above construction to abelian lattice-ordered groups. If G is such a group with strong (order) unit u, then the "unit interval" { x ∈ G | 0 ≤ x ≤ u } can be equipped with ¬x = u − x, x ⊕ y = u ∧_{G} (x + y), and x ⊗ y = 0 ∨_{G} (x + y − u). This construction establishes a categorical equivalence between lattice-ordered abelian groups with strong unit and MV-algebras.

An effect algebra that is lattice-ordered and has the Riesz decomposition property is an MV-algebra. Conversely, any MV-algebra is a lattice-ordered effect algebra with the Riesz decomposition property.

== Relation to Łukasiewicz logic ==
C. C. Chang devised MV-algebras to study many-valued logics, introduced by Jan Łukasiewicz in 1920. In particular, MV-algebras form the algebraic semantics of Łukasiewicz logic, as described below.

Given an MV-algebra A, an A-valuation is a homomorphism from the algebra of propositional formulas (in the language consisting of $\oplus,\lnot,$ and 0) into A. Formulas mapped to 1 (that is, to $\lnot$0) for all A-valuations are called A-tautologies. If the standard MV-algebra over [0,1] is employed, the set of all [0,1]-tautologies determines so-called infinite-valued Łukasiewicz logic.

Chang's (1958, 1959) completeness theorem states that any MV-algebra equation holding in the standard MV-algebra over the interval [0,1] will hold in every MV-algebra. Algebraically, this means that the standard MV-algebra generates the variety of all MV-algebras. Equivalently, Chang's completeness theorem says that MV-algebras characterize infinite-valued Łukasiewicz logic, defined as the set of [0,1]-tautologies.

The way the [0,1] MV-algebra characterizes all possible MV-algebras parallels the well-known fact that identities holding in the two-element Boolean algebra hold in all possible Boolean algebras. Moreover, MV-algebras characterize infinite-valued Łukasiewicz logic in a manner analogous to the way that Boolean algebras characterize classical bivalent logic (see Lindenbaum–Tarski algebra).

In 1984, Font, Rodriguez and Torrens introduced the Wajsberg algebra as an alternative model for the infinite-valued Łukasiewicz logic. Wajsberg algebras and MV-algebras are term-equivalent.

=== MV_{n}-algebras ===
In the 1940s, Grigore Moisil introduced his Łukasiewicz–Moisil algebras (LM_{n}-algebras) in the hope of giving algebraic semantics for the (finitely) n-valued Łukasiewicz logic. However, in 1956, Alan Rose discovered that for n ≥ 5, the Łukasiewicz–Moisil algebra does not model the Łukasiewicz n-valued logic. Although C. C. Chang published his MV-algebra in 1958, it is a faithful model only for the ℵ_{0}-valued (infinitely-many-valued) Łukasiewicz–Tarski logic. For the axiomatically more complicated (finitely) n-valued Łukasiewicz logics, suitable algebras were published in 1977 by Revaz Grigolia and called MV_{n}-algebras. MV_{n}-algebras are a subclass of LM_{n}-algebras; the inclusion is strict for n ≥ 5.

The MV_{n}-algebras are MV-algebras that satisfy some additional axioms, just like the n-valued Łukasiewicz logics have additional axioms added to the ℵ_{0}-valued logic.

In 1982, Roberto Cignoli published some additional constraints that added to LM_{n}-algebras yield proper models for n-valued Łukasiewicz logic; Cignoli called his discovery proper n-valued Łukasiewicz algebras. The LM_{n}-algebras that are also MV_{n}-algebras are precisely Cignoli's proper n-valued Łukasiewicz algebras.

== Relation to functional analysis ==
MV-algebras were related by Daniele Mundici to approximately finite-dimensional C*-algebras by establishing a bijective correspondence between all isomorphism classes of approximately finite-dimensional C*-algebras with lattice-ordered dimension group and all isomorphism classes of countable MV algebras. Some instances of this correspondence include:

| Countable MV algebra | approximately finite-dimensional C*-algebra |
|---|---|
| {0, 1} | $\mathbb{C}$ |
| {0, 1/n, ..., 1 } | $M_n (\mathbb{C})$, i.e. n×n complex matrices |
| finite | finite-dimensional |
| Boolean | commutative |

== In software ==
There are multiple frameworks implementing fuzzy logic (type II), and most of them implement what has been called a multi-adjoint logic. This is no more than the implementation of an MV-algebra.
