= Chang's model =

In mathematical set theory, Chang's model is the smallest inner model of set theory closed under countable sequences. It was introduced by Chang (1971). More generally Chang introduced the smallest inner model closed under taking sequences of length less than κ for any infinite cardinal κ. For κ countable this is the constructible universe, and for κ the first uncountable cardinal it is Chang's model.

Chang's model is a model of ZF. Kenneth Kunen proved in Kunen (1973) that the axiom of choice fails in Chang's model provided there are sufficient large cardinals, such as uncountably many measurable cardinals.
