= Stone algebra =

In mathematics, a Stone algebra or Stone lattice is a pseudocomplemented distributive lattice L in which any of the following equivalent statements hold for all $x, y \in L:$

- $(x\wedge y)^* = x^*\vee y^*$;
- $(x\vee y)^{**} = x^{**}\vee y^{**}$;
- $x^* \vee x^{**} = 1$.

They were introduced by Grätzer & Schmidt (1957), and named after Marshall Harvey Stone.

The set $S(L) \stackrel{\mathrm{def}}{=} \{ x^* \mid x\in L \}$ is called the skeleton of L. Then L is a Stone algebra if and only if its skeleton S(L) is a sublattice of L.

Boolean algebras are Stone algebras, and Stone algebras are Ockham algebras.

== Examples ==
- The open-set lattice of an extremally disconnected space is a Stone algebra.
- The lattice of positive divisors of a given positive integer is a Stone lattice.

== See also ==
- De Morgan algebra
- Heyting algebra
