= Ockham algebra =

In mathematics, an Ockham algebra is a bounded distributive lattice $L$ with a dual endomorphism, that is, an operation $\sim\colon L \to L$ satisfying

- $\sim (x \wedge y) ={} \sim x \vee {} \sim y$,
- $\sim(x \vee y) = {} \sim x \wedge {}\sim y$,
- $\sim 0 = 1$,
- $\sim 1 = 0$.

They were introduced by Berman, and were named after William of Ockham by Urquhart. Ockham algebras form a variety.

== Examples ==
Examples of Ockham algebras include Boolean algebras, De Morgan algebras, Kleene algebras, and Stone algebras.
