= Many-valued logic =

Propositional calculus in which there are more than two truth values

Many-valued logic (also multi- or multiple-valued logic) is a propositional or predicate calculus in which there are more than two truth values. Traditionally, in Aristotle's logical calculus, there were only two possible values (i.e., true and false) for any proposition. Classical two-valued logic may be extended to n-valued logic for n greater than 2. Those most popular in the literature are three-valued (e.g., Łukasiewicz's and Kleene's, which accept the values true, false, and unknown), four-valued, seven-valued, nine-valued, the finite-valued (finitely-many valued) with more than three values, and the infinite-valued (infinitely-many-valued), such as fuzzy logic and probability logic.

== History ==
Aristotle, the "father of (two-valued) logic", accepted the law of excluded middle but made an important distinction about the principle of bivalence. In (De Interpretatione, ch. IX), he argued that statements about future events cannot always be definitively true or false. However, he didn't develop this insight into a systematic multi-valued logic — it remained a specific exception within his classical framework. Logicians followed this Aristotelian logic tradition until the 20th century, consistently using the law of the excluded middle while acknowledging his concerns about future contingents. Systematic alternatives to classical logic only emerged in modern times.

The 20th century introduced the idea of multi-valued logic. The Polish logician and philosopher Jan Łukasiewicz began to create systems of many-valued logic in 1920, using a third value, possible, to deal with Aristotle's paradox of the sea battle. Meanwhile, the American mathematician, Emil L. Post (1921), also introduced the formulation of additional truth degrees with n ≥ 2, where n are the truth values. Later, Jan Łukasiewicz and Alfred Tarski together formulated a logic on n truth values where n ≥ 2. In 1932, Hans Reichenbach formulated a logic of many truth values where n→∞. Kurt Gödel in 1932 showed that intuitionistic logic is not a finitely-many valued logic, and defined a system of Gödel logics intermediate between classical and intuitionistic logic; such logics are known as intermediate logics.

== Examples ==
=== Kleene (strong) K_{3} and Priest logic P_{3} ===
Kleene's "(strong) logic of indeterminacy" K_{3} (sometimes $K_3^S$) and Priest's "logic of paradox" add a third undefined or indeterminate truth value I. The truth functions for negation (¬), conjunction (∧), disjunction (∨), implication, and biconditional are given by:

¬	
T	F
I	I
F	T

∧	T	I	F
T	T	I	F
I	I	I	F
F	F	F	F

∨	T	I	F
T	T	T	T
I	T	I	I
F	T	I	F

	T	I	F
T	T	I	F
I	T	I	I
F	T	T	T

	T	I	F
T	T	I	F
I	I	I	I
F	F	I	T

The difference between the two logics lies in how tautologies are defined. In K_{3} only T is a designated truth value, while in P_{3} both T and I are. (A logical formula is considered a tautology if it evaluates to a designated truth value). In Kleene's logic I can be interpreted as being underdetermined, being neither true nor false, while in Priest's logic I can be interpreted as being overdetermined, being both true and false. K_{3} does not have any tautologies, while P_{3} has the same tautologies as classical two-valued logic.

=== Bochvar's internal three-valued logic ===
Another logic is Dmitry Bochvar's internal three-valued logic $B_3^I$, also called Kleene's weak three-valued logic. Except for negation and biconditional, its truth tables are all different from the above.

	T	I	F
T	T	I	F
I	I	I	I
F	F	I	F

	T	I	F
T	T	I	T
I	I	I	I
F	T	I	F

	T	I	F
T	T	I	F
I	I	I	I
F	T	I	T

The intermediate truth value in Bochvar's internal logic can be described as contagious because it propagates in a formula regardless of the value of any other variable.

=== Belnap logic (B_{4}) ===
Belnap's logic B_{4} combines K_{3} and P_{3}. The overdetermined truth value is here denoted as B and the underdetermined truth value as N.

f_{¬}	
T	F
B	B
N	N
F	T

f_{∧}	T	B	N	F
T	T	B	N	F
B	B	B	F	F
N	N	F	N	F
F	F	F	F	F

f_{∨}	T	B	N	F
T	T	T	T	T
B	T	B	T	B
N	T	T	N	N
F	T	B	N	F

=== Gödel logics G_{k} and G_{∞} ===
In 1932 Gödel defined a family $G_k$ of many-valued logics, with finitely many truth values $0, \tfrac{1}{k - 1}, \tfrac{2}{k - 1}, \ldots, \tfrac{k - 2}{k - 1}, 1$, for example $G_3$ has the truth values $0, \tfrac{1}{2}, 1$ and $G_4$ has $0, \tfrac{1}{3}, \tfrac{2}{3}, 1$. In a similar manner he defined a logic with infinitely many truth values, $G_\infty$, in which the truth values are all the real numbers in the interval $[0, 1]$. The designated truth value in these logics is 1.

The conjunction $\wedge$ and the disjunction $\vee$ are defined respectively as the minimum and maximum of the operands:

$$\begin{align}
u \wedge v &:= \min\{u, v\} \\
u \vee v &:= \max\{u, v\}
\end{align}$$

Negation $\neg_G$ and implication $\xrightarrow[G]{}$ are defined as follows:

$$\begin{align}
\neg_G u &= \begin{cases}
1, & \text{if }u = 0 \\
0, & \text{if }u > 0
\end{cases} \\[3pt]
u \mathrel{\xrightarrow[G]{}} v &= \begin{cases}
1, & \text{if }u \leq v \\
v, & \text{if }u > v
\end{cases}
\end{align}$$

Gödel logics are completely axiomatisable, that is to say it is possible to define a logical calculus in which all tautologies are provable. The implication above is the unique Heyting implication defined by the fact that the suprema and minima operations form a complete lattice with an infinite distributive law, which defines a unique complete Heyting algebra structure on the lattice.

=== Łukasiewicz logics L_{v} and L_{∞} ===
Implication $\xrightarrow[L]{}$ and negation $\underset{L}{\neg}$ were defined by Jan Łukasiewicz through the following functions:

$$\begin{align}
\underset{L}{\neg} u &:= 1 - u \\
u \mathrel{\xrightarrow[L]{}} v &:= \min\{1, 1 - u + v\}
\end{align}$$

At first Łukasiewicz used these definitions in 1920 for his three-valued logic $L_3$, with truth values $0, \frac{1}{2}, 1$. In 1922 he developed a logic with infinitely many values $L_\infty$, in which the truth values spanned the real numbers in the interval $[0, 1]$. In both cases the designated truth value was 1.

By adopting truth values defined in the same way as for Gödel logics $0, \tfrac{1}{v-1}, \tfrac{2}{v-1}, \ldots, \tfrac {v-2} {v-1}, 1$, it is possible to create a finitely-valued family of logics $L_v$, the abovementioned $L_\infty$ and the logic $L_{\aleph_0}$, in which the truth values are given by the rational numbers in the interval $[0,1]$. The set of tautologies in $L_\infty$ and $L_{\aleph_0}$ is identical.

=== Product logic Π ===
In product logic we have truth values in the interval $[0,1]$, a conjunction $\odot$ and an implication $\xrightarrow [\Pi]{}$, defined as follows

$$\begin{align}
u \odot v &:= uv \\
u \mathrel{\xrightarrow[\Pi]{}} v &:=
\begin{cases}
1, & \text{if } u \leq v \\
\frac{v}{u}, & \text{if } u > v
\end{cases}
\end{align}$$

Additionally there is a negative designated value $\overline{0}$ that denotes the concept of false. Through this value it is possible to define a negation $\underset{\Pi}{\neg}$ and an additional conjunction $\underset{\Pi}{\wedge}$ as follows:

$$\begin{align}
\underset{\Pi}{\neg} u &:=
u \mathrel{\xrightarrow[\Pi]{}} \overline{0} \\
u \mathbin{\underset{\Pi}{\wedge}} v &:=
u \odot \left(u \mathrel{\xrightarrow[\Pi]{}} v\right)
\end{align}$$

and then $u \mathbin{\underset{\Pi}{\wedge}} v = \min\{u, v\}$.

=== Post logics P_{m} ===
In 1921 Post defined a family of logics $P_m$ with (as in $L_v$ and $G_k$) the truth values $0, \tfrac 1 {m-1}, \tfrac 2 {m-1}, \ldots, \tfrac {m-2} {m-1}, 1$. Negation $\underset{P}{\neg}$ and conjunction $\underset{P}{\wedge}$ and disjunction $\underset{P}{\vee}$ are defined as follows:

$$\begin{align}
\underset{P}{\neg} u &:= \begin{cases}
1, & \text{if } u = 0 \\
u - \frac{1}{m - 1}, & \text{if } u \not= 0
\end{cases} \\[6pt]
u \mathbin{\underset{P}{\wedge}} v &:= \min\{u,v\} \\[6pt]
u \mathbin{\underset{P}{\vee}} v &:= \max\{u,v\}
\end{align}$$

=== Rose logics ===
In 1951, Alan Rose defined another family of logics for systems whose truth-values form lattices.

== Relation to classical logic ==
Logics are usually systems intended to codify rules for preserving some semantic property of propositions across transformations. In classical logic, this property is truth. In a valid argument, the truth of the derived proposition is guaranteed if the premises are jointly true, because the application of valid steps preserves the property. However, that property doesn't have to be that of truth; instead, it can be some other concept.

When there are more than two truth values, rules of inference may be intended to preserve more than just whichever corresponds (in the relevant sense) to truth. For example, in a three-valued logic, sometimes the two greatest truth-values (when they are represented as e.g. positive integers) are designated and the rules of inference preserve these values.

For example, the preserved property could be justification, the foundational concept of intuitionistic logic. Thus, a proposition is not true or false; instead, it is justified or flawed. A key difference between justification and truth, in this case, is that the law of excluded middle doesn't hold: a proposition that is not flawed is not necessarily justified; instead, it's only not proven that it's flawed. The key difference is the determinacy of the preserved property: One may prove that P is justified, that P is flawed, or be unable to prove either. A valid argument preserves justification across transformations, so a proposition derived from justified propositions is still justified. However, there are proofs in classical logic that depend upon the law of excluded middle; since that law is not usable under this scheme, there are propositions that cannot be proven that way.

== Functional completeness of many-valued logics ==
Functional completeness is a term used to describe a special property of finite logics and algebras. A logic's set of connectives is said to be functionally complete or adequate if and only if its set of connectives can be used to construct a formula corresponding to every possible truth function. An adequate algebra is one in which every finite mapping of variables can be expressed by some composition of its operations.

Classical logic: CL = ({0,1}, ¬, →, ∨, ∧, ↔) is functionally complete, whereas no Łukasiewicz logic or infinitely many-valued logics has this property.

We can define a finitely many-valued logic as being L_{n} ({1, 2, ..., n} ƒ_{1}, ..., ƒ_{m}) where n ≥ 2 is a given natural number. Post (1921) proves that assuming a logic is able to produce a function of any m^{th} order model, there is some corresponding combination of connectives in an adequate logic L_{n} that can produce a model of order m+1.

== Applications ==
Known applications of many-valued logic can be roughly classified into two groups. The first group uses many-valued logic to solve binary problems more efficiently. For example, a well-known approach to represent a multiple-output Boolean function is to treat its output part as a single many-valued variable and convert it to a single-output characteristic function (specifically, the indicator function). Other applications of many-valued logic include design of programmable logic arrays (PLAs) with input decoders, optimization of finite-state machines, testing, and verification.

The second group targets the design of electronic circuits that employ more than two discrete levels of signals, such as many-valued memories, arithmetic circuits, and field programmable gate arrays (FPGAs). Many-valued circuits have a number of theoretical advantages over standard binary circuits. For example, the interconnect on and off chip can be reduced if signals in the circuit assume four or more levels rather than only two. In memory design, storing two instead of one bit of information per memory cell doubles the density of the memory in the same die size. Applications using arithmetic circuits often benefit from using alternatives to binary number systems. For example, residue and redundant number systems can reduce or eliminate the ripple-through carries that are involved in normal binary addition or subtraction, resulting in high-speed arithmetic operations. These number systems have a natural implementation using many-valued circuits. However, the practicality of these potential advantages heavily depends on the availability of circuit realizations, which must be compatible or competitive with present-day standard technologies. In addition to aiding in the design of electronic circuits, many-valued logic is used extensively to test circuits for faults and defects. Basically all known automatic test pattern generation (ATG) algorithms used for digital circuit testing require a simulator that can resolve 5-valued logic (0, 1, x, D, D'). The additional values—x, D, and D'—represent (1) unknown/uninitialized, (2) a 0 instead of a 1, and (3) a 1 instead of a 0.

A third area of application is in quantum information processing, where the natural computational unit is not necessarily a binary qubit. A qudit is a quantum system with d > 2 discrete levels, and quantum communication protocols using qudits can achieve higher channel capacities and stronger security guarantees than qubit-based protocols. The algebraic structure of qudit operations is naturally described by many-valued logic over the same number of levels, and several research groups have explored synthesis and optimization of qudit quantum circuits using Many-valued logic concepts as a basis. Photonic platforms, in particular, support high-dimensional encoding in degrees of freedom such as frequency, orbital angular momentum, and time bins, making qudit-based quantum communication an active area of experimental development.

== Research venues ==
An IEEE International Symposium on Multiple-Valued Logic (ISMVL) has been held annually since 1970. It mostly caters to applications in digital design and verification. There is also a Journal of Multiple-Valued Logic and Soft Computing.

== See also ==
Mathematical logic

- Degrees of truth
- Fuzzy logic
- Gödel logic
- Jaina seven-valued logic
- Kleene logic
- Kleene algebra (with involution)
- Łukasiewicz logic
- Belnaps logic
- MV-algebra
- Post logic
- Principle of bivalence
- A. N. Prior
- Relevance logic

Philosophical logic

- False dilemma
- Mu

Digital logic

- MVCML, multiple-valued current-mode logic
- IEEE 1164 a nine-valued standard for VHDL
- IEEE 1364 a four-valued standard for Verilog
- Three-state logic
- Noise-based logic
