= MVCML =

Multiple-valued current mode logic (MVCML) or current mode multiple-valued logic (CM-MVL) is a method of representing electronic logic levels in analog CMOS circuits. In MVCML, logic levels are represented by multiples of a base current, I_{base}, set to a certain value, x. Thus, level 0 is associated with the value of null, level 1 is associated with I_{base} = x, level 2 is represented by I_{base} = 2x, and so on.

== See also ==
- Many-valued logic
