= Chang's conjecture =

Mathematical conjecture

In model theory, a branch of mathematical logic, Chang's conjecture, attributed to Chen Chung Chang by Vaught (1963, p. 309), states that every model of type (ω_{2},ω_{1}) for a countable language has an elementary submodel of type (ω_{1},ω). A model is of type (α,β) if it is of cardinality α and a unary relation is represented by a subset of cardinality β. The usual notation is $(\omega_2,\omega_1)\twoheadrightarrow(\omega_1,\omega)$.

The axiom of constructibility implies that Chang's conjecture fails. Silver proved the consistency of Chang's conjecture from the consistency of an ω_{1}-Erdős cardinal. Hans-Dieter Donder showed a weak version of the reverse implication: if Chang's conjecture is not only consistent but actually holds, then ω_{2} is ω_{1}-Erdős in K.

More generally, Chang's conjecture for two pairs (α,β), (γ,δ) of cardinals is the claim that every model of type (α,β) for a countable language has an elementary submodel of type (γ,δ). The consistency of $(\omega_3,\omega_2)\twoheadrightarrow(\omega_2,\omega_1)$ was shown by Laver from the consistency of a huge cardinal.
