= De Morgan algebra =

System of logic lacking the excluded middle law

In mathematics, a De Morgan algebra (named after Augustus De Morgan, a British mathematician and logician) is a structure A = (A, ∨, ∧, 0, 1, ¬) such that:

- (A, ∨, ∧, 0, 1) is a bounded distributive lattice, and
- ¬ is a De Morgan involution: ¬(x ∧ y) = ¬x ∨ ¬y and ¬¬x = x. (i.e. an involution that additionally satisfies De Morgan's laws)

In a De Morgan algebra, the laws

- ¬x ∨ x = 1 (law of the excluded middle), and
- ¬x ∧ x = 0 (law of noncontradiction)

do not always hold. In the presence of the De Morgan laws, either law implies the other, and an algebra which satisfies them becomes a Boolean algebra.

Remark: It follows that ¬(x ∨ y) = ¬x ∧ ¬y, ¬1 = 0 and ¬0 = 1 (e.g. ¬1 = ¬1 ∨ 0 = ¬1 ∨ ¬¬0 = ¬(1 ∧ ¬0) = ¬¬0 = 0). Thus ¬ is a dual automorphism of (A, ∨, ∧, 0, 1).

If the lattice is defined in terms of the order instead, i.e. (A, ≤) is a bounded partial order with a least upper bound and greatest lower bound for every pair of elements, and the meet and join operations so defined satisfy the distributive law, then the complementation can also be defined as an involutive anti-automorphism, that is, a structure A = (A, ≤, ¬) such that:

- (A, ≤) is a bounded distributive lattice, and
- ¬¬x = x, and
- x ≤ y → ¬y ≤ ¬x.

De Morgan algebras are important for the study of the mathematical aspects of fuzzy logic. The standard fuzzy algebra F = ([0, 1], max(x, y), min(x, y), 0, 1, 1 − x) is an example of a De Morgan algebra where the laws of excluded middle and noncontradiction do not hold.

Another example is Dunn's four-valued semantics for De Morgan algebra, which has the values T(rue), F(alse), B(oth), and N(either), where

- F < B < T,
- F < N < T, and
- B and N are not comparable.

== History ==
De Morgan algebras were introduced by Grigore Moisil around 1935, although without the restriction of having a 0 and a 1. They were then variously called quasi-boolean algebras in the Polish school, e.g. by Rasiowa and also distributive i-lattices by J. A. Kalman. (i-lattice being an abbreviation for lattice with involution.) They have been further studied in the Argentinian algebraic logic school of Antonio Monteiro.

== Kleene algebra ==
If a De Morgan algebra additionally satisfies x ∧ ¬x ≤ y ∨ ¬y, it is called a Kleene algebra. (This notion should not be confused with the other Kleene algebra generalizing regular expressions.) This notion has also been called a normal i-lattice by Kalman.

Examples of Kleene algebras in the sense defined above include: lattice-ordered groups, Post algebras and Łukasiewicz algebras. Boolean algebras also meet this definition of Kleene algebra. The simplest Kleene algebra that is not Boolean is Kleene's three-valued logic K_{3}. K_{3} made its first appearance in Kleene's On notation for ordinal numbers (1938). The algebra was named after Kleene by Brignole and Monteiro.

== Related notions ==
De Morgan algebras are not the only plausible way to generalize Boolean algebras. Another way is to keep ¬x ∧ x = 0 (i.e. the law of noncontradiction) but to drop the law of the excluded middle and the law of double negation. This approach (called semicomplementation) is well-defined even for a (meet) semilattice; if the set of semicomplements has a greatest element it is usually called pseudocomplement, and the resulting algebra is a Heyting algebra. If the pseudocomplement satisfies the law of the excluded middle, the resulting algebra is also Boolean. However, if only the weaker law ¬x ∨ ¬¬x = 1 is required, this results in Stone algebras. More generally, both De Morgan and Stone algebras are proper subclasses of Ockham algebras.

== See also ==
- Orthocomplemented lattice
