= Cohen algebra =

Type of Boolean algebra

In mathematical set theory, a Cohen algebra, named after Paul Cohen, is a type of Boolean algebra used in the theory of forcing. A Cohen algebra is a Boolean algebra whose completion is isomorphic to the completion of a free Boolean algebra (Koppelberg 1993).
