= Random number =

Number generated by a random process

Dice are an example of a mechanical hardware random number generator. When a cubical die is rolled, a random number from 1 to 6 is obtained.

A random number is generated by a random (stochastic) process such as throwing dice. Individual numbers cannot be predicted, but the likely result of generating a large quantity of numbers can be predicted by specific mathematical series and statistics. Digits of the random binary numbers are random bits or coins.

== Algorithms and implementations ==
Random numbers are frequently used in algorithms such as Knuth's 1964-developed algorithm for shuffling lists. (popularly known as the Knuth shuffle or the Fisher–Yates shuffle, based on work they did in 1938).

In 1999, a new feature was added to the Pentium III: a hardware-based random number generator. It has been described as "several oscillators combine their outputs and that odd waveform is sampled asynchronously." These numbers, however, were only 32 bit, at a time when export controls were on 56 bits and higher, so they were not state of the art.

== Common understanding ==
In common understanding, "1 2 3 4 5" is not as random as "3 5 2 1 4" and certainly not as random as "47 88 1 32 41" but "we can't say authoritavely that the first sequence is not random ... it could have been generated by chance."

When a police officer claims to have done a "random .. door-to-door" search, there is a certain expectation that members of a jury will have.

== Real world consequences ==
Flaws in randomness have real-world consequences.

A 99.8% randomness was shown by researchers to negatively affect an estimated 27,000 customers of a large service and that the problem was not limited to just that situation.

== See also ==
- Algorithmically random sequence
- Quasi-random sequence
- Random number generation
  - Non-uniform random number generation
- Random real
- Random sequence
- Random variable
- Random variate
