= 3-methyl-2-oxobutanoate dehydrogenase (acetyl-transferring) kinase =

Class of enzymes

[3-methyl-2-oxobutanoate dehydrogenase (lipoamide)] kinase

Identifiers
- EC no.: 2.7.11.4
- CAS no.: 82391-38-6

Databases
- BRENDA: enzyme data
- ExPASy: NiceZyme view
- KEGG: enzyme entry
- MetaCyc: metabolic pathway
- Rhea: reactions
- PDB structures: RCSB PDB PDBe PDBsum
- Gene Ontology: AmiGO / QuickGO
Search
- PMC: articles
- PubMed: articles
- NCBI: proteins

In enzymology, a [3-methyl-2-oxobutanoate dehydrogenase (acetyl-transferring)] (EC 2.7.11.4) is an enzyme that catalyzes the chemical reaction

ATP + [3-methyl-2-oxobutanoate dehydrogenase (acetyl-transferring)] $\rightleftharpoons$ ADP + [3-methyl-2-oxobutanoate dehydrogenase (acetyl-transferring)] phosphate

Thus, the two substrates of this enzyme are ATP and 3-methyl-2-oxobutanoate dehydrogenase (acetyl-transferring), whereas its 3 products are ADP, 3-methyl-2-oxobutanoate dehydrogenase (acetyl-transferring), and phosphate.

This enzyme belongs to the family of transferases, specifically those transferring a phosphate group to the sidechain oxygen atom of serine or threonine residues in proteins (protein-serine/threonine kinases). The systematic name of this enzyme class is ATP:[3-methyl-2-oxobutanoate dehydrogenase (acetyl-transferring)] phosphotransferase. Other names in common use include kinase, BCK, BCKD kinase, BCODH kinase, branched-chain alpha-ketoacid dehydrogenase kinase, branched-chain 2-oxo acid dehydrogenase kinase, branched-chain keto acid dehydrogenase kinase, branched-chain oxo acid dehydrogenase kinase (phosphorylating), and STK2.

In 2012, it was suggested that mutations in the gene which expresses this enzyme could be the cause of a rare form of autism.

== Literature ==
- Paxton R, Harris RA (1982). "Isolation of rabbit liver branched chain alpha-ketoacid dehydrogenase and regulation by phosphorylation". J. Biol. Chem. 257 (23): 14433–9. doi:10.1016/S0021-9258(19)45399-4. PMID 7142221.
- Wynn RM, Chuang JL, Cote CD, Chuang DT (2000). "Tetrameric assembly and conservation in the ATP-binding domain of rat branched-chain alpha-ketoacid dehydrogenase kinase". J. Biol. Chem. 275 (39): 30512–9. doi:10.1074/jbc.M005075200. PMID 10903321.
- Chuang JL, Wynn RM, Chuang DT (2002). "The C-terminal hinge region of lipoic acid-bearing domain of E2b is essential for domain interaction with branched-chain alpha-keto acid dehydrogenase kinase". J. Biol. Chem. 277 (40): 36905–8. doi:10.1074/jbc.C200430200. PMID 12189132.
- Popov KM, Hawes JW, Harris RA (1997). "Mitochondrial alpha-ketoacid dehydrogenase kinases: a new family of protein kinases". Adv Second Messenger Phosphoprotein Res. 31: 105–11. doi:10.1016/S1040-7952(97)80012-2. PMID 9344245. (See ISBN 978-0-12-036131-1 for its print version.)
