= Random algebra =

Mathematical theory

In set theory, the random algebra or random real algebra is the Boolean algebra of Borel sets of the unit interval modulo the ideal of measure zero sets. It is used in random forcing to add random reals to a model of set theory. The random algebra was studied by John von Neumann in 1935 (in work later published as Neumann (1998, p. 253)) who showed that it is not isomorphic to the Cantor algebra of Borel sets modulo meager sets. Random forcing was introduced by Solovay (1970).

== See also ==
- Random number
