= Chen Chung Chang =

Chinese American mathematician

C. C. Chang
- Born: 1927; Tianjin, China
- Died: July 17, 2014 (aged 86 or 87); Santa Clarita, California
- Known for: Chang's conjecture
- Scientific career
- Fields: Mathematics
- Institutions: University of California, Los Angeles
- Doctoral advisor: Alfred Tarski
- Doctoral students: Thomas N. Hibbard

Chen Chung Chang (Chinese: 张晨钟) was a mathematician who worked in model theory. Typically known by his initials "C.C." he obtained his PhD from Berkeley in 1955 on "Cardinal and Ordinal Factorization of Relation Types" under Alfred Tarski. He then became a professor at the mathematics department of the University of California, Los Angeles, where he remained for the rest of his career.

Chang wrote the standard text Chang & Keisler (1990) on model theory. Chang's conjecture and Chang's model are named after him. He also proved the ordinal partition theorem (expressed in the arrow notation for Ramsey theory) ω^{ω}→(ω^{ω},3)^{2}, originally a problem of Erdős and Hajnal. He also introduced MV-algebras as models for Łukasiewicz logic.

== Selected publications ==
- Chang, Chen Chung; Keisler, H. Jerome (1966), Continuous Model Theory, Annals of Mathematics Studies, vol. 58, Princeton University Press, ISBN 0691079293 (xii+165 pp.)
- Chang, Chen Chung; Keisler, H. Jerome (1990), Model Theory, Studies in Logic and the Foundations of Mathematics (3rd ed.), Elsevier, ISBN 978-0-444-88054-3
- C. C. Chang. Algebraic analysis of many-valued logics. Transactions of the American Mathematical Society, 88, 467–490, 1958, doi:10.1090/S0002-9947-1958-0094302-9

== See also ==
- Wilfrid Hodges
