= Pseudocomplement =

In mathematics, particularly in order theory, a pseudocomplement is one generalization of the notion of complement. In a lattice L with bottom element 0, an element x ∈ L is said to have a pseudocomplement if there exists a greatest element $x^*\in L$ with the property that $x\wedge x^*=0$. More formally, $x^* = \max\{y\in L\mid x\wedge y = 0 \}$. The lattice L itself is called a pseudocomplemented lattice if every element of L is pseudocomplemented. Every pseudocomplemented lattice is necessarily bounded, i.e. it has a 1 as well. Since the pseudocomplement is unique by definition (if it exists), a pseudocomplemented lattice can be endowed with a unary operation * mapping every element to its pseudocomplement; this structure is sometimes called a p-algebra. However this latter term may have other meanings in other areas of mathematics.

== Properties ==
In a p-algebra L, for all $x, y \in L:$

- The map $x \mapsto x^*$ is antitone. In particular, $0^* = 1$ and $1^* = 0$.
- The map $x \mapsto x^{**}$ is a closure.
- $x^* = x^{***}$.
- $(x\vee y)^* = x^* \wedge y^*$.
- $(x\wedge y)^{**} = x^{**} \wedge y^{**}$.
- $x\wedge(x\wedge y)^* = x\wedge y^*$.

The set $S(L) \stackrel{\mathrm def}{=} \{ x^* \mid x\in L \}$ is called the skeleton of L. S(L) is a $\wedge$-subsemilattice of L and together with $x\cup y = (x\vee y)^{**} = (x^*\wedge y^*)^*$ forms a Boolean algebra (the complement in this algebra is $^*$). In general, S(L) is not a sublattice of L. In a distributive p-algebra, S(L) is the set of complemented elements of L.

Every element x with the property $x^* = 0$ (or equivalently, $x^{**} = 1$) is called dense. Every element of the form $x\vee x^*$ is dense. D(L), the set of all the dense elements in L is a filter of L. A distributive p-algebra is Boolean if and only if $D(L) = \{1\}$.

Pseudocomplemented lattices form a variety; indeed, so do pseudocomplemented semilattices.

== Examples ==
- Every finite distributive lattice is pseudocomplemented.
- Every Stone algebra is pseudocomplemented. In fact, a Stone algebra can be defined as a pseudocomplemented distributive lattice L in which any of the following equivalent statements hold for all $x, y \in L:$
  - S(L) is a sublattice of L;
  - $(x\wedge y)^* = x^*\vee y^*$;
  - $(x\vee y)^{**} = x^{**}\vee y^{**}$;
  - $x^* \vee x^{**} = 1$.
- Every Heyting algebra is pseudocomplemented.
- If X is a topological space, the (open set) topology on X is a pseudocomplemented (and distributive) lattice with the meet and join being the usual union and intersection of open sets. The pseudocomplement of an open set A is the interior of the set complement of A. Furthermore, the dense elements of this lattice are exactly the dense open subsets in the topological sense.

== Relative pseudocomplement ==
A relative pseudocomplement of a with respect to b is a maximal element c such that $a\wedge c\le b$. This binary operation is denoted $a\to b$. A lattice with a relative pseudocomplement for each pair of elements is called an implicative lattice, or Brouwerian lattice. In general, an implicative lattice may not have a minimal element. If such a minimal element exists, then each pseudocomplement $a^*$ could be defined using relative pseudocomplement as $a\to 0$.

== See also ==
- Topological vector lattice
