= BCK algebra =

In mathematics, BCI and BCK algebras are algebraic structures in universal algebra, which were introduced by Y. Imai, K. Iséki and S. Tanaka in 1966, that describe fragments of the propositional calculus involving implication known as BCI and BCK logics.

== Definition ==
=== BCI algebra ===
An algebra (in the sense of universal algebra) $\left( X;\ast ,0\right)$ of type $\left( 2,0\right)$ is called a BCI-algebra if, for any $x,y,z\in X$, it satisfies the following conditions. (Informally, we may read $0$ as "truth" and $x\ast y$ as "$y$ implies $x$".)

BCI-1
$$\left( \left( x\ast y\right) \ast \left( x\ast z\right)
\right) \ast \left( z\ast y\right) =0$$
BCI-2
$$\left( x\ast \left( x\ast y\right) \right) \ast y=0$$
BCI-3
$$x\ast x=0$$
BCI-4
$$x\ast y=0 \land y\ast x=0\implies x=y$$
BCI-5
$$x\ast 0=0 \implies x=0$$

=== BCK algebra ===
A BCI-algebra $\left( X;\ast ,0\right)$ is called a BCK-algebra if it satisfies the following condition:

BCK-1
$$\forall x\in X: 0\ast x=0.$$

A partial order can then be defined as x ≤ y iff x * y = 0.

A BCK-algebra is said to be commutative if it satisfies:

$$x\ast (x\ast y)= y\ast (y\ast x)$$

In a commutative BCK-algebra x * (x * y) = x ∧ y is the greatest lower bound of x and y under the partial order ≤.

A BCK-algebra is said to be bounded if it has a largest element, usually denoted by 1. In a bounded commutative BCK-algebra the least upper bound of two elements satisfies x ∨ y = 1 * ((1 * x) ∧ (1 * y)); that makes it a distributive lattice.

== Examples ==
Every abelian group is a BCI-algebra, with * defined as group subtraction and 0 defined as the group identity.

The subsets of a set form a BCK-algebra, where A*B is the difference A\B (the elements in A but not in B), and 0 is the empty set.

A Boolean algebra is a BCK algebra if A*B is defined to be A∧¬B (A does not imply B).

The bounded commutative BCK-algebras are precisely the MV-algebras.
