= Algebraic semantics (mathematical logic) =

Formal semantics based on algebras

In mathematical logic, algebraic semantics is a formal semantics based on algebras studied as part of algebraic logic. For example, the modal logic S4 is characterized by the class of topological boolean algebras—that is, boolean algebras with an interior operator. Other modal logics are characterized by various other algebras with operators. The class of boolean algebras characterizes classical propositional logic, and the class of Heyting algebras propositional intuitionistic logic. MV-algebras are the algebraic semantics of Łukasiewicz logic.

== See also ==
- Algebraic semantics (computer science)
- Lindenbaum–Tarski algebra
