= Jan Łukasiewicz =

Polish logician and philosopher (1878–1956)

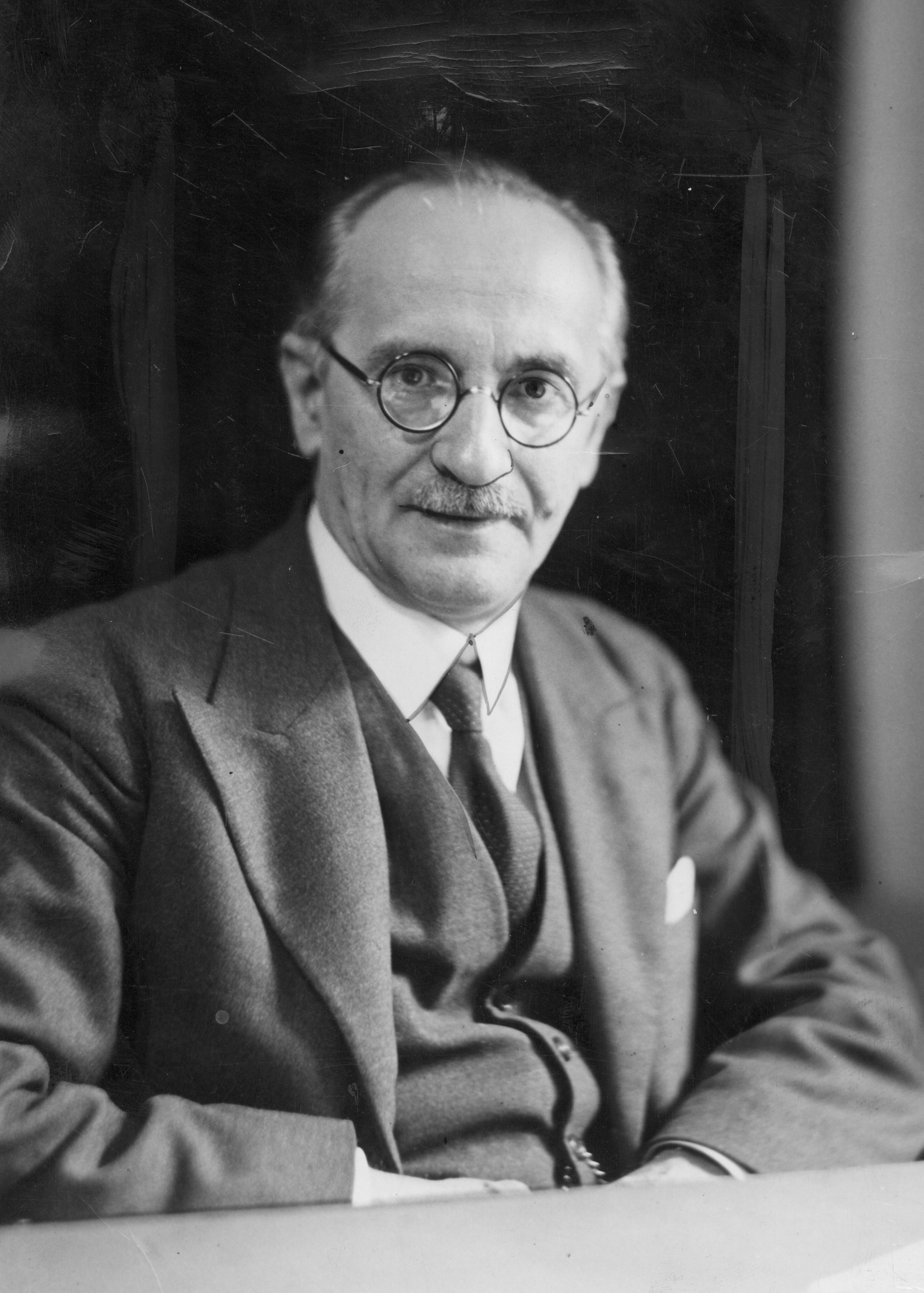
- Łukasiewicz in 1935
- Born: Jan Leopold Łukasiewicz; 21 December 1878; Lemberg, Kingdom of Galicia and Lodomeria, Austria-Hungary
- Died: 13 February 1956 (aged 77); Dublin, Ireland

Education
- Education: Lemberg University
- Thesis: On Induction as the Inverse of Deduction (1902)
- Doctoral advisor: Kazimierz Twardowski

Philosophical work
- Era: 20th-century philosophy
- Region: Western philosophy: Polish philosophy
- School: Lwów–Warsaw school Analytic philosophy
- Institutions: Lemberg University; University of Warsaw; Royal Irish Academy
- Main interests: Philosophical logic, mathematical logic, history of logic
- Notable ideas: Polish notation Łukasiewicz logic Łukasiewicz–Moisil algebra Reductive reasoning

Jan Leopold Łukasiewicz (Polish: [ˈjan wukaˈɕɛvit͡ʂ]; 21 December 1878 – 13 February 1956) was a Polish logician, and philosopher who is best known for Polish notation and Łukasiewicz logic. His work centred on philosophical logic, mathematical logic and history of logic. He thought innovatively about traditional propositional logic, the principle of non-contradiction and the law of excluded middle, offering one of the earliest systems of many-valued logic. Contemporary research on Aristotelian logic also builds on innovative works by Łukasiewicz, which applied methods from modern logic to the formalization of Aristotle's syllogistic.

The Łukasiewicz approach was reinvigorated in the early 1970s in a series of papers by John Corcoran and Timothy Smiley that inform modern translations of Prior Analytics by Robin Smith in 1989 and Gisela Striker in 2009. Łukasiewicz is regarded as one of the most important historians of logic.

== Life ==
He was born as Jan Leopold Łukasiewicz on 21 December 1878 in Lemberg, Austria-Hungary (now Lviv, Ukraine) and was the only child of Paweł Łukasiewicz, a captain in the Austro-Hungarian Army, and Leopoldina, née Holtzer, the daughter of a civil servant. His family was Roman Catholic.

He finished his gymnasium studies in philology and in 1897 went on to Lemberg University, where he studied philosophy and mathematics. He was a pupil of the philosopher Kazimierz Twardowski.

In 1902, he received a Doctor of Philosophy degree under the patronage of Emperor Franz Joseph I of Austria, who gave him a special doctoral ring with diamonds. His thesis entitled Indukcja jako inwersja dedukcji (On Induction as the Inverse of Deduction) was written under the supervision of Twardowski.

He spent three years as a private teacher, and in 1905, he received a scholarship to complete his philosophy studies at the University of Berlin and the University of Louvain in Belgium.

Łukasiewicz continued studying for his habilitation qualification and in 1906 submitted his thesis to the University of Lemberg. That year, he was appointed a lecturer at the University of Lemberg, where he was eventually appointed Extraordinary Professor by Emperor Franz Joseph I. He taught there until the First World War.

In 1915, he was invited to lecture as a full professor at the University of Warsaw, which the German occupation authorities had reopened after it had been closed down by the Tsarist government in the 19th century.

In 1919, Łukasiewicz left the university to serve as Polish Minister of Religious Denominations and Public Education in Paderewski's government until 1920. Łukasiewicz led the development of a Polish curriculum replacing the Russian, German and Austrian curricula that had been used in partitioned Poland. The Łukasiewicz curriculum emphasized the early acquisition of logical and mathematical concepts.

In 1928, he married Regina Barwińska.

He remained a professor at the University of Warsaw from 1920 until 1939, when the family house was destroyed by German bombs, and the university was closed by the German occupation. He had been a rector of the university twice during which Łukasiewicz and Stanisław Leśniewski had founded the Lwów–Warsaw school of logic, which was later made famous internationally by Alfred Tarski, who had been a student of Leśniewski.

During the start of the Second World War, he worked at the Warsaw Underground University. After the German occupation authorities had closed the university, he earned a meager living in the Warsaw city archive. His friendship with Heinrich Scholz (German professor of mathematical logic) helped him, too, and it was Scholz who arranged for the Łukasiewicz family's passage to Germany in 1944 (Łukasiewicz was fearful of the Red Army advance). As it became increasingly clear that Germany would lose the war, Łukasiewicz and his wife tried to move to Switzerland, but were unable to get permission from the German authorities. They thus spent the last months of the war in Münster, Germany. After the end of the war, unwilling to return to a Soviet-controlled Poland, they moved first to Belgium, where Łukasiewicz taught logic at a provisional Polish Scientific Institute.

In February 1946, at the invitation of Irish political leader Éamon de Valera (himself a mathematician by profession), Łukasiewicz and his wife relocated to Dublin, where they remained until his death there a decade later. In Ireland, he briefly served as Professor of Mathematical Logic at the Royal Irish Academy (a position created for him). His duties involved giving frequent public lectures.

During this period, his book Elements of Mathematical Logic was published in English by Macmillan (1963, translated from Polish by Olgierd Wojtasiewicz).

Jan Łukasiewicz died on 13 February 1956. He was buried in Mount Jerome Cemetery, in Dublin. At the urging of the Armenian community in Poland, his remains were repatriated to Poland 66 years later. He was reburied on 22 November 2022 in Warsaw's Old Powązki Cemetery.

From October to December 2022, the Royal Irish Academy in Dublin hosted an exhibition on his life and work.

Łukasiewicz's papers (post-1945) are held by the University of Manchester Library.

== Work ==
A number of axiomatizations of classical propositional logic are due to Łukasiewicz. A particularly elegant axiomatization features a mere three axioms and is still invoked to the present day. He was a pioneer investigator of multi-valued logics; his three-valued propositional calculus, introduced in 1917, was the first explicitly axiomatized non-classical logical calculus. He wrote on the philosophy of science, and his approach to the making of scientific theories was similar to the thinking of Karl Popper.

Łukasiewicz invented the Polish notation (named after his nationality) for the logical connectives around 1920. A quotation from a paper by Jan Łukasiewicz in 1931 states how the notation was invented:

I came upon the idea of a parenthesis-free notation in 1924. I used that notation for the first time in my article Łukasiewicz (1), p. 610, footnote.

— Łukasiewicz 1970, p. 180, Footnote 3

The reference cited by Łukasiewicz, i.e., Łukasiewicz (1), is apparently a lithographed report in Polish. The referring paper by Łukasiewicz was reviewed by Henry A. Pogorzelski in the Journal of Symbolic Logic in 1965.

In Łukasiewicz's 1951 book, Aristotle's Syllogistic from the Standpoint of Modern Formal Logic, he mentions that the principle of his notation was to write the functors before the arguments to avoid brackets (i.e., parentheses) and that he had employed his notation in his logical papers since 1929. He then goes on to cite, as an example, a 1930 paper he wrote with Alfred Tarski on the sentential calculus. (Note: Łukasiewicz & Tarski 1930 (in German). Translation: Łukasiewicz & Tarski 1956)

This notation is the root of the idea of the recursive stack, a last-in, first-out computer memory store proposed by several researchers including Turing, Bauer and Hamblin, and first implemented in 1957. In 1960, Łukasiewicz's notation concepts and stacks were used as the basis of the Burroughs B5000 computer designed by Robert S. Barton and his team at Burroughs Corporation in Pasadena, California. The concepts also led to the design of the English Electric multi-programmed KDF9 computer system of 1963, which had two such hardware register stacks. A similar concept underlies the reverse Polish notation (RPN, a postfix notation) of the Friden EC-130 calculator and its successors, many Hewlett-Packard calculators, the Lisp and Forth programming languages, and the PostScript page description language.

== Recognition and honours ==
In 1923, Łukasiewicz became the recipient of the Commander's Cross with Star of the Order of Polonia Restituta.

In 1935, Łukasiewicz was awarded the Hungarian Order of Merit.

In 1955, Łukasiewicz received an honorary doctorate from the Trinity College Dublin in acknowledgement of his academic achievements. A commemorative plaque has been unveiled on the house where Łukasiewicz lived in Dublin at 57 Fitzwilliam Square.

In 1998, a minor planet discovered by Paul G. Comba was named 27114 Lukasiewicz in honour of the Polish philosopher and logician.

In 2008, the Polish Information Processing Society established the Jan Łukasiewicz Award, to be presented to the most innovative Polish IT companies.

From 1999 to 2004, the Department of Computer Science building at the University College Dublin was called the Łukasiewicz Building, until all campus buildings were renamed after the disciplines they housed.

His model of three-valued logic allowed for formulating Kleene's ternary logic and a meta-model of empiricism, mathematics and logic, i.e. senary logic.

== Chronology ==
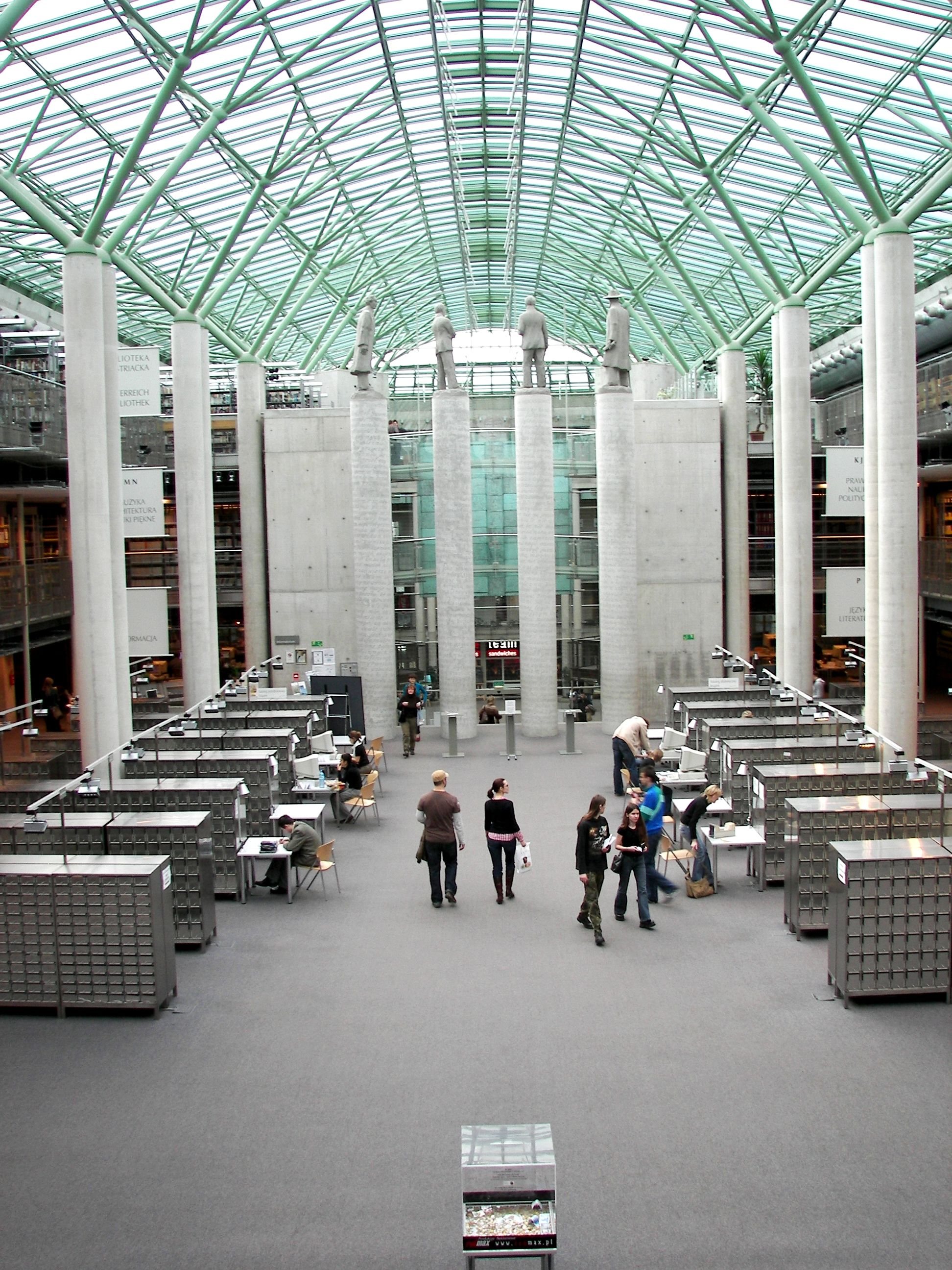
Warsaw University Library – at entrance (seen from rear) are pillared statues of Lwów-Warsaw School philosophers (right to left) Kazimierz Twardowski, Jan Łukasiewicz, Alfred Tarski, Stanisław Leśniewski.

- 1878 born in Lemberg (now Lviv)
- 1890–1902 studies with Kazimierz Twardowski in Lemberg (Lwów, L'viv)
- 1902 doctorate (mathematics and philosophy), University of Lemberg with the highest distinction possible
- 1906 habilitation thesis completed, University of Lemberg
- 1906 becomes a lecturer
- 1910 essays on the principle of non-contradiction and the excluded middle
- 1911 extraordinary professor at Lemberg
- 1915 invited to the newly reopened University of Warsaw
- 1916 new Kingdom of Poland declared
- 1917 develops three-valued propositional calculus
- 1919 Polish Minister of Education
- 1920–1939 professor at Warsaw University founds with Stanisław Leśniewski the Lwów–Warsaw school of logic (see also Alfred Tarski, Stefan Banach, Hugo Steinhaus, Zygmunt Janiszewski, Stefan Mazurkiewicz)
- 1928 marries Regina Barwińska
- 1944 flees to Germany and settles in Hembsen, in the Nethegau, where he was brought for his own safety.
- 1946 exile in Belgium
- 1946 held a chair at the Royal Irish Academy in Dublin.
- 1953 writes autobiography
- 1956 dies in Dublin

== Selected works ==
=== Books ===
- Łukasiewicz, Jan (1928), Elementy logiki matematycznej [Elements of Mathematical Logic] (in Polish), Warsaw: Państwowe Wydawnictwo Naukowe
- — (1957) [1951], Aristotle's Syllogistic from the Standpoint of Modern Formal Logic (2nd, enlarged ed.), Oxford University Press, ISBN 9780198241447 (Reprinted by Garland Publishing in 1987, ISBN 0-8240-6924-2)
- — (1964) [1958], Elementy logiki matematycznej [Elements of Mathematical Logic] (in Polish), translated by Wojtasiewicz, Olgierd (2nd ed.), New York: Macmillan, LCCN 63-10013, OCLC 671498
- — (1998), Jacek Jadacki (ed.), Logika i metafizyka. Miscellanea (in Polish), Warsaw, WFiS UW, ISBN 83-910113-3-X

=== Papers ===
- Łukasiewicz, Jan (1903), On Induction as Inversion of Deduction
- — (1906), Analysis and Construction of the Concept of Cause (Thesis)
- — (1910), "On the Principle of the Excluded Middle", History and Philosophy of Logic, 8 (1987): 67–69
- — (1910), "On the Principle of Contradiction in Aristotle", Review of Metaphysics, 24 (1971) (3), translated by Wedin, Vernon: 485–509, JSTOR 20125812
- — (1912), Creative Elements in Science (included in Łukasiewicz 1970, pp. 1–15)
- — (1913), On the Reversibility of the Relation of Ground and Consequence
- — (1913), Logical Foundations of Probability Theory (included in Łukasiewicz 1970, pp. 16–63)
- — (1915), On Science)
- — (1916), On the Concept of Magnitude (included in Łukasiewicz 1970, pp. 64–83)
- — (1918), Farewell Lecture by Professor Jan Lukasiewicz, delivered in the Warsaw University Lecture Hall on March 7, 1918 (included in Łukasiewicz 1970, pp. 84–86)
- — (1920), On Three-valued Logic (included in Łukasiewicz 1970, pp. 87–88)
- — (1921), Two-valued Logic (included in Łukasiewicz 1970, pp. 89–109)
- — (1922), On Determinism, "published for the first time in 1961" (included in Łukasiewicz 1970, pp. 110–128)
- — (1922), A Numerical Interpretation of the Theory of Propositions (included in Łukasiewicz 1970, pp. 129–130)
- — (1928), Concerning the Method in Philosophy
- — (1929), "O znaczeniu i potrzebach logiki matematycznej" [On Importance and Requirements of Mathematical Logic], Nauka Polska (in Polish), 10: 604–620
- — (1930), Philosophical Remarks on Many-Valued Systems of Propositional Logic
- —; Tarski, Alfred (1930), "Untersuchungen über den Aussagenkalkül" [Investigations into the Sentential Calculus], Comptes Rendus des séances de la Société des Sciences et des Lettres de Varsovie (in German), 23 (Cl. III): 31–32 (included in Łukasiewicz 1970, pp. 131–152)
- :—; Tarski, Alfred (1956) [1930], "Chapter IV: Investigations into the Sentential Calculus", Logic, Semantics, Metamathematics: Papers from 1923 to 1938 by Alfred Tarski, translated by J. H., Woodger, Oxford University Press, pp. 39–59

—; Tarski, Alfred (1983) [1930], "Chapter IV: Investigations into the Sentential Calculus", in John, Corcoran (ed.), Logic, Semantics, Metamathematics: Papers from 1923 to 1938 by Alfred Tarski, translated by J. H., Woodger (2nd ed.), Hackett Publishing Company, pp. 38–59, ISBN 0915144-76-X

- — (1930), "Philosophische Bemerkungen zu mehrwertigen Systemen des Aussagenkalküls" [Philosophical Remarks on Many-Valued Systems of Propositional Logic], Comptes rendus de la Société des Sciences et des Lettres de Varsovie, cl. III, 23: 51–77 (included in Łukasiewicz 1970, pp. 153–178)
- — (1931), "Uwagi o aksjomacie Nicoda i 'dedukcji uogólniającej'" [Comments on Nicod's Axiom and on 'Generalizing Deduction'], Księga pamiątkowa Polskiego Towarzystwa Filozoficznego We Lwowie, 12. II. 1904-12. II. 1929 (in Polish), Lwów: Wydawnictwo Polskie Towarzystwo Filozoficzne, pp. 366–383 (included in Łukasiewicz 1970, pp. 179–196)
- — (1934), Importance of Logical Analysis for Knowledge
- — (1934), Outlines of the History of the Propositional Logic (included in Łukasiewicz 1970, pp. 197–217)
- — (1936), Logistic and Philosophy (included in Łukasiewicz 1970, pp. 218–235)
- — (1937), In Defense of Logistic (included in Łukasiewicz 1970, pp. 236–249)
- — (1938), The Equivalential Calculus (included in Łukasiewicz 1970, pp. 250–277)
- — (1927), Logic and the Problem of the Foundations of Mathematics (included in Łukasiewicz 1970, pp. 278–294)
- — (1948), "The Shortest Axiom of the Implicational Calculus of Propositions", Proceedings of the Royal Irish Academy. Section A: Mathematical and Physical Sciences, 52, Royal Irish Academy: 25–33, JSTOR 20488489 (included in Łukasiewicz 1970, pp. 295–305)
- — (1950), On the System of Axioms of the Implicational Propositional Calculus (included in Łukasiewicz 1970, pp. 306–310)
- — (1938), On Descartes's Philosophy
- — (1951), On Variable Functors of Propositional Arguments (included in Łukasiewicz 1970, pp. 311–324)
- — (1952), On the Intuitionistic Theory of Deduction (included in Łukasiewicz 1970, pp. 325–340)
- — (1953), Formalization of Mathematical Theories (included in Łukasiewicz 1970, pp. 341–351)
- — (1953), "A System of Modal Logic", The Journal of Computing Systems, 1 (3): 111–149 (included in Łukasiewicz 1970, pp. 352–390)
- — (1954), Arithmetic and Modal Logic (included in Łukasiewicz 1970, pp. 391–400)
- — (1954), On a Controversial Problem of Aristotle's Modal Syllogistic
- — (1970), Borkowski, L. [in Polish] (ed.), Selected Works, Amsterdam and London/Warszawa: North-Holland Publishing Company/Polish Scientific Publishers, p. 405, ISBN 978-0720422528, LCCN 74-96734, OCLC 115237, "Contains List of Publications by Jan Łukasiewicz, pp. 401–405"

== See also ==
- History of philosophy in Poland
- List of Poles
- Logical operators
- Truth function
- 27114 Lukasiewicz
