= Outline of thought =

Overview of and topical guide to thought

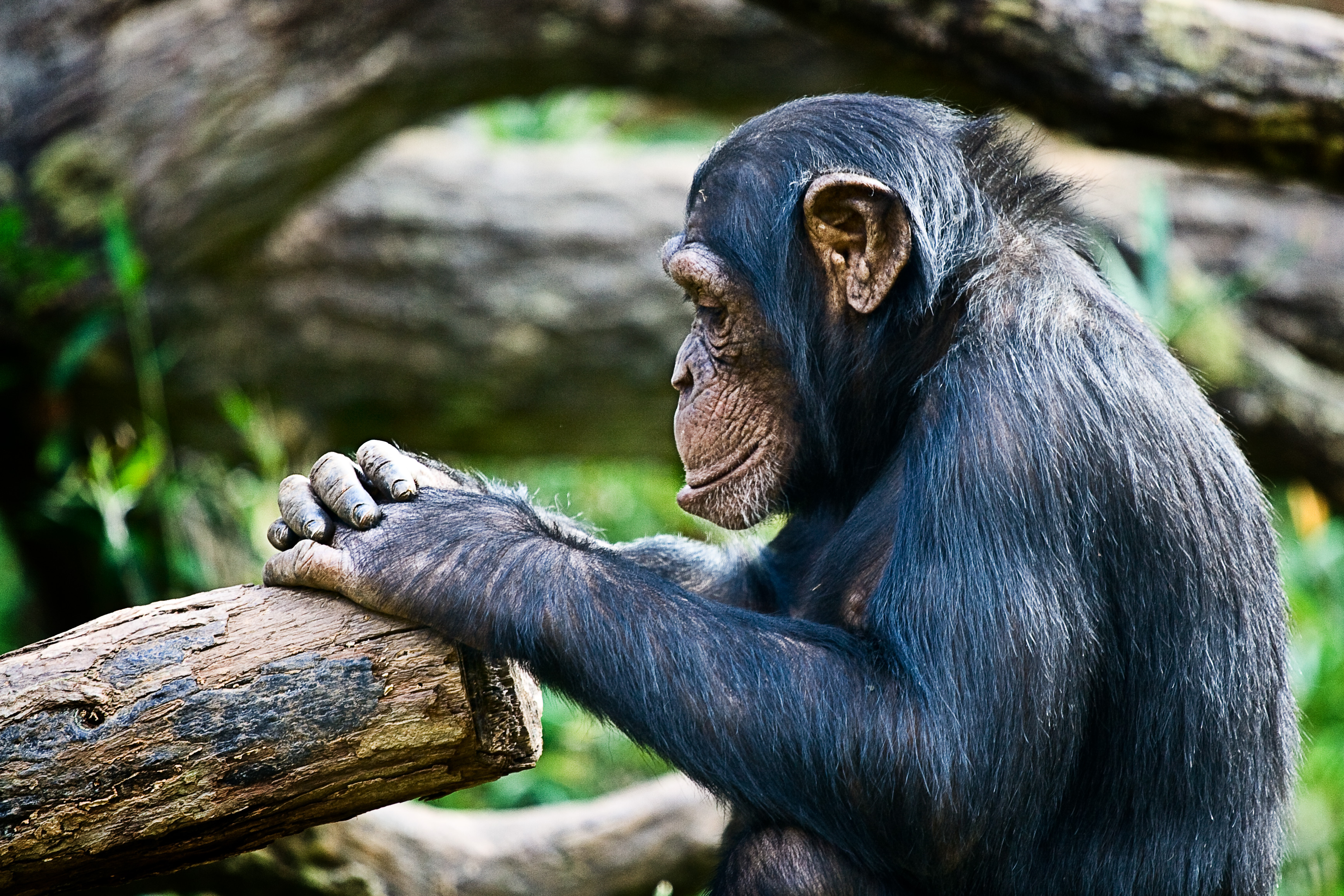
A thinking chimpanzee

The following outline is provided as an overview of and topical guide to thought (thinking):

Thought is the object of a mental process called thinking, in which beings form psychological associations and models of the world. Thinking is manipulating information, as when we form concepts, engage in problem solving, reason and make decisions. Thought, the act of thinking, produces more thoughts. A thought may be an idea, an image, a sound or even control an emotional feeling.

== Nature of thought ==
Thought (or thinking) can be described as all of the following:

- An activity taking place in a:
  - brain – organ that serves as the center of the nervous system in all vertebrate and most invertebrate animals (only a few invertebrates such as sponges, jellyfish, adult sea squirts and starfish do not have a brain). It is the physical structure associated with the mind.
    - mind – abstract entity with the cognitive faculties of consciousness, perception, thinking, judgement, and memory. Having a mind is a characteristic of living creatures. Activities taking place in a mind are called mental processes or cognitive functions.
  - computer (see § Machine thought below) – general purpose device that can be programmed to carry out a set of arithmetic or logical operations automatically. Since a sequence of operations (an algorithm) can be readily changed, the computer can solve more than one kind of problem.
- An activity of intelligence – intelligence is the intellectual process of which is marked by cognition, motivation, and self-awareness. Through intelligence, living creatures possess the cognitive abilities to learn, form concepts, understand, apply logic, and reason, including the capacities to recognize patterns, comprehend ideas, plan, problem solve, make decisions, retaining, and use language to communicate. Intelligence enables living creatures to experience and think.
  - A type of mental process – something that individuals can do with their minds. Mental processes include perception, memory, thinking, volition, and emotion. Sometimes the term cognitive function is used instead.
- A biological adaptation mechanism
  - Neural network explanation: Thoughts are created by the summation of neural outputs and connections of which vectors form. These vectors describe the magnitude and direction of the connections and action between neurons. The graphs of these vectors can represent a network of neurons whose connections fire in different ways over time as synapses fire. These large thought vectors in the brain cause other vectors of activity. For example: An input from the environment is received by the neural network. The network changes the magnitude and outputs of individual neurons. The altered network outputs the symbols needed to make sense of the input.

== Types of thoughts ==
1. Foundational Representations
- Concept – Fundamental unit of cognition
  - Abstract concept – Metaphysics concept covering the divide between two types of entities
  - Concrete concept – Metaphysics concept covering the divide between two types of entities
- Idea – Mental image or concept
- Mental image – Representation in the mind of objects, activities or events, whether they existed or not
- Percept / Perception

2. Propositions and Beliefs

- Logical assertion – Statement in a metalanguage
- Proposition – Bearer of truth values
- Premise – Statement supporting a conclusion
- Belief – Subjective attitude that something is true

3. Reasoning and Argumentation

- Argument – Attempt to persuade or to determine the truth of a conclusion
  - Logical argument – Attempt to persuade or to determine the truth of a conclusion
- Syllogism – Type of logical argument that applies deductive reasoning

4. Inquiry and Speculation

- Conjecture – Proposition in mathematics that is unproven
- Hypothesis – Proposed explanation for an observation, phenomenon, or scientific problem
- Thought experiment – Hypothetical situation

5. Explanation and Synthesis

- Explanation – Set of statements constructed to describe a set of facts which clarifies causes
- Theory – Supposition or system of ideas intended to explain something
- Conceptual model – Theoretical framework
- Mental model – Mental representation of the external world
- Schema – Pattern of thought or behavior

6. Definition

- Definition – Statement that attaches a meaning to a term

7. Decision Making

- Decision (see Decision-making)

=== Content of thoughts ===
- Communication – Transmission of information
- Data – Unit of information
- Information – Facts provided or learned about something or someone
- Knowledge – Awareness of facts, or competency
- Self-concept – One's internal beliefs about oneself

== Types of thought (thinking) ==
Listed below are types of thought, also known as thinking processes.

=== Human thought ===
Human thought – Cognitive process independent of the senses

- Analysis – Process of understanding a complex topic or substance
- Awareness – State of knowing or noticing something
- Calculation – Arithmetical calculations using only the human brain
  - Estimation – Process of finding an approximation
- Categorization – Putting things into categories
- Cognitive restructuring – Type of psychological therapy
- Computational thinking – Set of problem-solving methods
- Convergent thinking – Ability to answer questions correctly without the need for novel ideas
- Counterfactual thinking – Concept in psychology
- Critical thinking – Analysis of facts to form a judgment
- Data thinking – Product design framework
- Evaluation – Characterizing and appraising something
- Habit – Routine of behavior that is repeated regularly and tends to occur subconsciously
- Integrative thinking – Reframing Critical Thinking Skills (CTS) for Group-Decision-Support-Systems (GDSS)
- Intrapersonal communication – Communication with oneself
- Introspection – Examining one's own thoughts and feelings
- Learning – Process of acquiring new knowledge and memory
- Parallel thinking – Maltese physician (1933–2021)
- Prediction – Statement about a future event
- Recollection – Retrieval of events or information from the past
- Stochastic thinking
- Strategic thinking – Cognitive activity
- Training – Acquisition of knowledge, skills, and competencies as a result of teaching or practice
- Visual thinking – Thinking through visual processing

==== Classifications of thought ====
- Bloom's taxonomy – Classification system in education
- Dual process theory – Psychological theory of how thought can arise in two different ways
- Fluid and crystallized intelligence – Factors of general intelligence
- Higher-order thinking – Concept in education and education reform
- Theory of multiple intelligences – Educational model of human intelligence
- Three-stratum theory – Cognitive ability theory
- Williams' taxonomy

==== Creative processes ====
- Brainstorming – Group creativity technique
- Cognitive module – Concept in cognitive psychology
- Creativity – Forming something new and somehow valuable
- Creative problem solving – Mental process of problem solving
- Creative writing – Academic discipline concerned with creating literature
- Creativity techniques – Methods devised to encourage creative actions
- Design thinking – Processes by which design concepts are developed
- Divergent thinking – Process of generating creative ideas
- Imagination – Creative ability
- Lateral thinking – Manner of solving problems
- Noogony – Epistemological term
- Six Thinking Hats – 1985 book by Maltese Dr. Edward de Bono
- Speech act – Utterance that serves a performative function
- Stream of consciousness – Thoughts flowing through the conscious mind
- Thinking outside the box – Metaphor for unconventional thinking

==== Decision-making ====
- Choice – Deciding between multiple options
- Cybernetics – Study of circular causal processes
- Decision theory – Branch of applied probability theory
- Executive functions – Cognitive processes necessary for control of behavior
- Goals and goal setting – Idea of the future or result that a person or group wants to achieve
- Judgement – Evaluation of circumstances to make a decision
- Planning – Regarding the activities required to achieve a desired goal
- Rational choice theory – Class of models in the behavioral sciences
- Speech act – Utterance that serves a performative function
- Value (personal and cultural) – Personal value, basis for ethical action
- Value judgment – Philosophical and ethical concept

==== Erroneous thinking ====
- Black and white thinking – Failure to think in nuances
- Catastrophization – Statement that represents something in an excessive manner
- Cognitive bias – Systematic pattern of deviation from norm or rationality in judgment
- Cognitive distortion – Exaggerated or irrational thought patterns
- Dysrationalia – Inability to think and behave rationally despite adequate intelligence
- Emotional reasoning – Cognitive process
- Exaggeration – Statement that represents something in an excessive manner
- Foolishness – Lack of social norms causing offence or similar effect
- Fallacies – Argument that uses faulty reasoning (see also List of fallacies)
  - Fallacies of definition – Ways in which a term may be poorly defined
  - Logical fallacy – Form of incorrect argument in natural language
- Groupthink – Psychological phenomenon that occurs within a group of people
- Irrationality – Thinking, talking, or acting without inclusion of rationality
- Linguistic error – Unintended deviation from the rules of a language variety
- Magical thinking – Belief in the connection of unrelated events
- Minimisation (psychology) – Type of deception
- Motivated reasoning – Processing personal/social information
- Rationalization (psychology) – Psychological defense mechanism
- Rhetoric – Art of persuasion
- Straight and Crooked Thinking – Book by Robert H. Thouless (book)
- Target fixation – Attentional phenomenon
- Wishful thinking – Formation of beliefs based on what might be pleasing to imagine

==== Emotional intelligence (emotionally based thinking) ====
Emotional intelligence – Capability to understand one's emotions

- Acting – Storytelling by enacting a character
- Affect logic – Theory on interaction between feeling and thinking
- Allophilia – Positive attitude towards others who are different
- Attitude (psychology) – Concept in psychology and communication studies
- Curiosity – Quality related to inquisitive thinking
- Elaboration likelihood model – Dual process theory of persuasion
- Emotion – Conscious subjective experiences and feelings
- Emotion and memory – Critical factors contributing to the emotional enhancement effect on human memory
- Emotional contagion – Spontaneous spread of emotions among a group
- Empathy – Ability to understand or feel what another is feeling
- Epiphany (feeling) – Positive affect associated with sudden understanding
- Mood (psychology) – Relatively long lasting emotional, internal and subjective state
- Motivation – Inner state causing goal-directed behavior
- Propositional attitude – Concept in epistemology
- Rhetoric – Art of persuasion
- Self actualization – Human emotional need
- Self control – Aspect of inhibitory control
- Self-esteem – Human emotional need
- Self-determination theory – Macro theory of human motivation and personality
- Social cognition – Study of cognitive processes involved in social interactions
- Will (philosophy) – Faculty that selects among a being's desires
- Volition (psychology) – Cognitive process of decision to act

==== Problem solving ====
Problem solving – Process of achieving a goal by overcoming obstacles

- Problem solving steps
  - Problem finding – Problem discovery
- Process of elimination – Method of identifying an entity of interest
- Systems thinking – Examining complex systems as a whole
  - Critical systems thinking – Systems thinking multimethodology
- Problem-solving strategy – steps one would use to find the problem(s) that are in the way to getting to one's own goal. Some would refer to this as the 'problem-solving cycle' (Bransford & Stein, 1993). In this cycle one will recognize the problem, define the problem, develop a strategy to fix the problem, organize the knowledge of the problem cycle, figure-out the resources at the user's disposal, monitor one's progress, and evaluate the solution for accuracy.
  - Abstraction – Process of generalization – solving the problem in a model of the system before applying it to the real system
  - Analogy – Form of figurative language – using a solution that solves an analogous problem
  - Brainstorming – Group creativity technique – (especially among groups of people) suggesting a large number of solutions or ideas and combining and developing them until an optimum solution is found
  - Divide and conquer – Process of understanding a complex topic or substance – breaking down a large, complex problem into smaller, solvable problems
  - Hypothesis testing – Method of statistical inference – assuming a possible explanation to the problem and trying to prove (or, in some contexts, disprove) the assumption
  - Lateral thinking – Manner of solving problems – approaching solutions indirectly and creatively
    - Oblique Strategies – Set of cards intended to promote creativity
    - Parallel thinking – Maltese physician (1933–2021)
    - Provocative operation – Signals provocation
    - Six Thinking Hats – 1985 book by Maltese Dr. Edward de Bono
  - Means-ends analysis – Problem solving technique – choosing an action at each step to move closer to the goal
  - Morphological analysis – Exploration of possible solutions – assessing the output and interactions of an entire system
  - Proof – Sufficient evidence/argument for truth – try to prove that the problem cannot be solved. The point where the proof fails will be the starting point for solving it
  - Reduction – Transformation of one computational problem to another – transforming the problem into another problem for which solutions exist
  - Research – Systematic study undertaken to increase knowledge – employing existing ideas or adapting existing solutions to similar problems
  - Root cause analysis – Method of identifying the fundamental causes of faults or problems – identifying the cause of a problem
  - Thinking outside the box – Metaphor for unconventional thinking
  - Trial-and-error – Method of problem-solving – testing possible solutions until the right one is found
  - Troubleshooting – Form of problem solving, often applied to repair failed products or processes –
- Problem-solving methodology
  - 5 Whys – Iterative interrogative technique
  - Decision cycle – Sequence of steps for decision-making
  - Eight Disciplines Problem Solving – Eight disciplines of team-oriented problem solving method
  - GROW model – Method for goal setting and problem solving
  - How to Solve It – 1945 book on problem solving by George Pólya
  - Learning cycle – How people learn from experience
  - OODA loop – Observe–orient–decide–act cycle (observe, orient, decide, and act)
  - PDCA – Iterative design and management method (plan–do–check–act)
  - Problem structuring methods – Techniques used to model a situation to be changed
  - RPR Problem Diagnosis (rapid problem resolution)
  - TRIZ – Problem-solving tools (in Russian: Teoriya Resheniya Izobretatelskikh Zadatch, "theory of solving inventor's problems")
  - Vertical thinking – Thinking technique that involves an analytical approach to problem solving

==== Reasoning ====
Reasoning – Capacity for consciously making sense of things

- Abstract thinking – Process of generalization
- Adaptive reasoning – Problem solving strategy
- Analogical reasoning – Form of figurative language
- Analytic reasoning – Ability to look at information and discern patterns
- Case-based reasoning – Process of solving new problems based on the solutions of similar past problems
- Critical thinking – Analysis of facts to form a judgment
- Defeasible reasoning – Reasoning that is rationally compelling, though not deductively valid – from authority: if p then (defeasibly) q
- Diagrammatic reasoning – Reasoning by means of visual representations – reasoning by means of visual representations. Visualizing concepts and ideas with of diagrams and imagery instead of by linguistic or algebraic means
- Emotional reasoning – Cognitive process (erroneous) – a cognitive distortion in which emotion overpowers reason, to the point the subject is unwilling or unable to accept the reality of a situation because of it.
- Fallacious reasoning – Argument that uses faulty reasoning (erroneous) – logical errors
- Heuristic – Problem-solving methods
- Historical thinking
- Intuitive reasoning – Ability to acquire knowledge without conscious reasoning
- Lateral thinking – Manner of solving problems
- Logic – Study of correct reasoning / Logical reasoning
  - Abductive reasoning – Inference seeking the simplest and most likely explanation – from data and theory: p and q are correlated, and q is sufficient for p; hence, if p then (abducibly) q as cause
  - Deductive reasoning – Form of reasoning – from meaning postulate, axiom, or contingent assertion: if p then q (i.e., q or not-p)
  - Inductive reasoning – Method of logical reasoning – theory formation; from data, coherence, simplicity, and confirmation: (inducibly) "if p then q"; hence, if p then (deducibly-but-revisably) q
  - Inference – Steps in reasoning
- Moral reasoning – Study in psychology that overlaps with moral philosophy – process in which an individual tries to determine the difference between what is right and what is wrong in a personal situation by using logic. This is an important and often daily process that people use in an attempt to do the right thing. Every day for instance, people are faced with the dilemma of whether or not to lie in a given situation. People make this decision by reasoning the morality of the action and weighing that against its consequences.
- Probabilistic reasoning – Applications of logic under uncertainty – from combinatorics and indifference: if p then (probably) q
- Proportional reasoning – Reasoning about comparative relationships – using "the concept of proportions when analyzing and solving a mathematical situation."
- Rational thinking – Quality of being agreeable to reason
- Semiosis – Mode of communication
- Statistical reasoning – Study of collection and analysis of data – from data and presumption: the frequency of qs among ps is high (or inference from a model fit to data); hence, (in the right context) if p then (probably) q
- Strategic thinking – Cognitive activity
- Synthetic reasoning – Semantic distinction in philosophy
- Verbal reasoning – Understanding and reasoning using concepts framed in words – understanding and reasoning using concepts framed in words
- Visual reasoning – process of manipulating one's mental image of an object in order to reach a certain conclusion – for example, mentally constructing a piece of machinery to experiment with different mechanisms

=== Machine thought ===
- Artificial creativity
- Automated reasoning
  - Commonsense reasoning
  - Model-based reasoning
  - Opportunistic reasoning
  - Qualitative reasoning – automated reasoning about continuous aspects of the physical world, such as space, time, and quantity, for the purpose of problem solving and planning using qualitative rather than quantitative information
  - Spatial–temporal reasoning
  - Textual case based reasoning
- Computer program (recorded machine thought instructions)
- Human-based computation

=== Organizational thought ===
Organizational thought (thinking by organizations)

- Management information system – Information system used for organizational decision-making and coordination
- Organizational communication – Field of study in communication studies
- Organizational planning
  - Strategic planning – Organizational decision making process
- Strategic thinking – Cognitive activity
- Systems theory – Interdisciplinary study of systems

== Aspects of the thinker ==
Aspects of the thinker which may affect (help or hamper) his or her thinking:

- Ability – Ability to influence the behaviour of others
- Aptitude – Ability; competence to do a certain kind of work at a certain level
- Attitude – Concept in psychology and communication studies
- Behavior – Actions by entities within a system
- Cognitive style – Concept in cognitive psychology
- Common sense – Basic level of knowledge and judgement shared by nearly all people
- Experience – Conscious event, perception or practical knowledge
- Instinct – Behaviour due to innate biological factors
- Intelligence – Ability to perceive, infer, retain or apply information
- Metacognition – Self-awareness about thinking, higher-order thinking skills
- Mental image – Representation in the mind of objects, activities or events, whether they existed or not
- Mindset – Term in decision theory and general systems theory
- Preference – To like one thing more than another
- Rationality – Quality of being agreeable to reason
- Skill – Ability to carry out a task
- Wisdom – Combination of wit and virtue
  - Sapience – Combination of wit and virtue

== Properties of thought ==
- Accuracy and precision – Measures of observational error
- Cogency
- Dogma – Beliefs accepted by members of a group without question
- Effectiveness – Capability of producing the desired result
- Efficacy – Ability to finish a task satisfactorily
- Efficiency – Degree to which a process minimizes waste of resources
- Freethought – Position that beliefs should be formed only on the basis of logic, reason, and empiricism
- Frugality – Being frugal in the consumption of consumable resources
- Meaning – Study of meaning in language
- Prudence – Ability of a person to regulate itself with the use of reason
- Rights – Legal, social, or ethical principles
- Skepticism – Doubtful attitude toward knowledge claims
- Soundness – Term in logic and deductive reasoning
- Validity – Argument whose conclusion must be true if its premises are
- Value theory – Systematic study of values
- Wrongdoing – Act that is illegal or immoral

== Fields that study thought ==
- Linguistics – Scientific study of language
- Philosophy – Study of general and fundamental questions
  - Logic – Study of correct reasoning
  - Philosophy of mind – Branch of philosophy
- Neuroscience – Scientific study of the nervous system
  - Cognitive science – Interdisciplinary scientific study of cognitive processes
  - Psychology – Study of mental functions and behaviors
    - Cognitive psychology – Subdiscipline of psychology
    - Social psychology – Study of social effects on people's thoughts, feelings, and behaviors
  - Psychiatry – Branch of medicine devoted to mental disorders
- Mathematics – Field of knowledge
- Operations research – Discipline concerning the application of advanced analytical methods

== Thought tools and thought research ==
- Cognitive model – Model of cognition's operation
- Design tool – Objects, media, or computer programs, which can be used to design
- Diagram – Symbolic representation of information using visualization techniques
  - Argument map – Visual representation of the structure of an argument
  - Concept map – Diagram showing relationships among concepts
  - Mind map – Diagram to visually organize information
- DSRP – Theory and method of thinking
- Intelligence amplification – Use of information technology to augment human intelligence
- Language – Structured system of communication
- Meditation – Techniques to train attention and awareness
- Six Thinking Hats – 1985 book by Maltese Dr. Edward de Bono
- Synectics – Thought process for making the strange familiar and the familiar strange

== History of thinking ==
History of reasoning – Capacity for consciously making sense of things

- History of artificial intelligence
- History of cognitive science – Interdisciplinary scientific study of cognitive processes
- History of the concept of creativity
- History of ideas – Study of the history of human ideas and of intellectuals
- History of logic
- History of psychometrics – Theory and technique of psychological measurement

== Nootropics (cognitive enhancers and smart drugs) ==
Nootropic – Compound intended to improve cognitive function

Substances claimed to improve mental performance:

- 5-Hydroxytryptophan, also known as 5-HTP
- Adrafinil – Wakefulness-promoting drug (Olmifon)
- Aniracetam – Medication
- Withania somnifera, also known as Ashwagandha – Species of flowering plant
- Bacopa monnieri – Species of aquatic plant (Brahmi)
- Caffeine – Central nervous system stimulant
- Acetylcarnitine, also known as Acetyl-L-carnitine – Form of L-carnitine (ALCAR)
- Meclofenoxate, also known as Centrophenoxine – Chemical compound
- Choline – Chemical compound and essential nutrient
- Cholinergic – Agent which mimics choline
- Chromium
- Coenzyme Q10 – Biochemical cofactor and antioxidant
- Coffee – Brewed beverage
- Creatine – Chemical compound
- Dimethylethanolamine (DMAE)
- Ergoloid mesylates – Chemical compound (Hydergine)
- Huperzine A – Chemical compound
- Idebenone – Chemical compound
- Inositol – Carbocyclic sugar
- L-DOPA – Chemical compound
- Lecithin – Generic term for amphiphilic substances of plant and animal origin
- Lemon balm – Species of plant (Melissa Officinalis)
- Lipoic acid
- Methylphenidate – Central nervous system stimulant (Ritalin)
- Modafinil – Wakefulness-promoting medication (Provigil)
- Oxiracetam – Chemical compound
- Phenibut – CNS depressant medication
- Phenylalanine – Type of α-amino acid
- Piracetam – Chemical compound (Nootropil)
- Pramiracetam – Chemical compound
- Pyritinol – Chemical compound (Enerbol)
- Rhodiola rosea – Species of flowering plant in the stonecrop family
- Selegiline (Deprenyl) – Medication
- Eleutherococcus senticosus, also known as Siberian ginseng – Species of flowering plant
- Hypericum perforatum, also known as St John's Wort – Flowering plant in the St John's wort family
- Sutherlandia frutescens – Species of legume
- Tea – Brewed beverage made from tea leaves
- Theanine – Amino acid
- Theophylline – Drug used to treat respiratory diseases
- Tryptophan
- Tyrosine – Amino acid
- Vasopressin – Mammalian hormone released from the pituitary gland
- Vinpocetine – Chemical compound
- Vitamin B_{3}, also known as Nicotinic acid – Class of vitamins
- Vitamin B_{5} – Vitamin
- Vitamin B_{6} – Class of vitamins
- Vitamin B_{12} – Class of vitamins
- Vitamin C – Essential nutrient found in citrus fruits and other foods
- Pausinystalia johimbe, also known as Yohimbe – Species of flowering plant

=== Organizational thinking concepts ===
- Attribution theory – Process by which individuals explain causes of behavior and events
- Communication – Transmission of information
- Concept testing – Surveys to judge the success of a new product before its introduction to the market
- Evaporating Cloud – Thinking process
- Fifth discipline – 1990 book by Peter Senge
- Groupthink – Psychological phenomenon that occurs within a group of people
- Collective intelligence, also known as Group synergy – Group intelligence that emerges from collective efforts
- Ideas bank – Sourcing services or funds from a group
- Language interpretation – Facilitating of oral or sign-language communication between users of different languages
- Learning organization – Type of company
- Metaplan
- Operations research – Discipline concerning the application of advanced analytical methods
- Organization development – Study and implementation of techniques that affect organizational change
- Organizational communication – Field of study in communication studies
- Organizational culture – Customary behaviours in an organization
- Organizational ethics – Field of ethics focusing on organizations
- Organizational learning – Academic discipline; examines how goal-driven social entities add and create knowledge
- Rhetoric – Art of persuasion
- Smart mob – Digital-communication coordinated group
- Theory of constraints – Management paradigm
- Think tank – Organization that performs policy research and advocacy
- Wisdom of crowds – 2004 book by James Surowiecki

== Teaching methods and skills ==
- Active learning – Educational technique
- Classical conditioning – Aspect of learning procedure
- Directed listening and thinking activity
- Discipline – Self-control
- Learning theory (education) – Theory that describes how students receive, process, and retain knowledge during learning
- Mentorship – Guidance relationship
- Operant conditioning – Type of associative learning process for behavioral modification
- Problem-based learning – Learner-centric pedagogy
- Punishment – Imposition of an undesirable or unpleasant outcome
- Reinforcement – Consequence affecting an organism's future behavior

== Awards related to thinking ==
=== Awards for acts of genius ===
- Nobel Prize – Prizes established by Alfred Nobel in 1895
- Pulitzer Prize – Awards for American journalism and arts
- MacArthur Fellows Program – Annual prize by the MacArthur Foundation

== Organizations ==
- Associations pertaining to thought
  - Association for Automated Reasoning
  - Association for Informal Logic and Critical Thinking
  - International Joint Conference on Automated Reasoning – Conferences series on automated reasoning, automated deduction, and related fields
- High IQ societies – Organization for people with a high IQ score
- Mind Sports Organisation – Association for promoting mind sports
  - World Mind Sports Games – Multi-sport event
- Think tank – Organization that performs policy research and advocacy

== Media ==
=== Publications ===
==== Books ====
- Handbook of Automated Reasoning

==== Periodicals ====
- Journal of Automated Reasoning
- Journal of Formalized Reasoning
- Positive Thinking Magazine

=== Television programs ===
- Thinkabout (U.S. TV series)

== Persons associated with thinking ==
=== People notable for their extraordinary ability to think ===
- Geniuses
  - List of Nobel laureates (see also Nobel Prize)
- Polymaths
- Intellectual

=== Scientists in fields that study thought ===
- List of cognitive scientists

=== Scholars of thinking ===
- Aaron T. Beck
- Edward de Bono
- Tony Buzan
- Noam Chomsky
- Albert Ellis
- Howard Gardner
- Eliyahu M. Goldratt
- Douglas Hofstadter
- Ray Kurzweil
- Marvin Minsky
- Richard W. Paul
- Steven Pinker
- Bertrand Russell
- Baruch Spinoza
- Robert Sternberg

== Related concepts ==
- Cognition
- Knowledge
- Multiple intelligences
- Strategy
- Structure
- System
- Ideation
- Fact

=== Awareness and perception ===
- Attention
- Analysis paralysis
- Action plan
- Cognition
- Cognitive dissonance
- Cognitive map
- Concept
- Concept map
- Conceptual framework
- Conceptual model
- Consciousness
- Domain knowledge
- focus
- Heuristics in judgment and decision making
- Hyperfocus
- Information
- Intelligence
- Intuition
- Knowledge
- Memory suppression
- Mental image
- Mental model
- Mental state
- Metaknowledge (knowledge about knowledge)
- Mind map
- Mindfulness (psychology)
- Percept
- Perception
- Self-awareness
- Self-concept
- Self-consciousness
- Self-knowledge
- Self-realization
- Sentience
- Situational awareness
- Understanding

=== Learning and memory ===
- Autodidacticism
- Biofeedback
- Cognitive dissonance
- Dual-coding theory
- Eidetic memory (total recall)
- Emotion and memory
- Empiricism
- Feedback
- Feedback loop
- Free association
- Heuristics
- Hyperthymesia
- Hypnosis
- Hypothesis
- Imitation
- Inquiry
- Knowledge management
- Language acquisition
- Memorization
- Memory and aging
- Memory inhibition
- Memory-prediction framework
- Method of loci
- Mnemonics
- Neurofeedback
- Neuro-linguistic programming (NLP)
- Observation
- Pattern recognition
- Question
- Reading
- Recall
- Recognition
- Recollection (recall)
- Scientific method
- Self-perception theory
- Speed reading
- Study Skills
- Subvocalization
- Transfer of learning
- Transfer of training
- Visual learning

Miscellaneous

- Adaptation
- Association of Ideas
- Attacking Faulty Reasoning
- Autistic thinking (see Glossary of psychiatry)
- Backcasting
- Causality
- Chunking (psychology)
- Cognition
- Cognitive biology
- Cognitive computing
- Cognitive deficit
- Cognitive dissonance
- Cognitive linguistics
- Cognitive module
- Cognitive psychology
- Cognitive science
- Cognitive space
- Cognitive style
- Communicating
- Comparative cognition
- Concept-formation
- Conceptual metaphor
- Conceptual thinking
- Conscience
- Consciousness
- Constructive criticism
- Conversation
- Criticism
- Creativity techniques
- Dereistic thinking (see Glossary of psychiatry)
- Design (and re-design)
- Dialectic
- Dream
- Discovery (observation)
- Distinction (philosophy)
- Distributed cognition
- Decision tree
- Distributed multi-agent reasoning system
- Educational assessment
- Emotion
- Empirical knowledge
- Empiricism
- Epistemology
- Evidential reasoning (disambiguation)
- Evidential reasoning approach
- Expectation (epistemic)
- Experimentation
- Explanation
- Expert
- Extension (semantics)
- Facilitation (business)
- Fantasy
- Fideism
- Figure Reasoning Test
- Fuzzy logic
- Fuzzy-trace theory
- Generalizing
- Gestalt psychology
- Group cognition
- Heuristics in judgment and decision making
- Holism
- Human multitasking
- Human self-reflection
- Hypervigilance
- Identification (information)
- Inductive reasoning aptitude
- Intellect
- Intellectual
- Intelligence (trait)
- Intentionality
- Inventing
- Innovation
- Invention
- Judging
- Kinesthetic learning
- Knowledge management
- Knowledge representation and reasoning
- Language
- Linguistics
- List of cognitive scientists
- List of creative thought processes
- List of emotional intelligence topics
- List of emotions
- List of organizational thought processes
- List of perception-related topics
- Mathematics Mechanization and Automated Reasoning Platform
- Mental function
- Mental model theory of reasoning
- Meta-analytic thinking
- Meta-ethical
- Methodic doubt
- Mimesis
- Mind
- Models of scientific inquiry
- Morphological analysis (problem-solving)
- Natural language processing
- Nonduality
- Nous
- Pattern matching
- Personality psychology
- Persuasion
- Philomath
- Philosophical analysis
- Philosophical method
- Planning
- Po (term)
- Practical reason
- Preconscious
- Prediction
- Procedural reasoning system
- Pseudoscience
- Pseudoskepticism
- Psychological projection
- Psychology of reasoning
- Qualitative Reasoning Group
- Rationality and Power
- Reasoning Mind
- Reasoning system
- Recognition-primed decision
- Reflective disclosure
- Scientific method
- Self-deception
- Semantic network
- Semantics
- Semiotics
- Sensemaking
- Situated cognition
- Situational awareness
- Skepticism
- Source criticism
- Spatial cognition
- Speculative reason
- Spiral: The Bonds of Reasoning
- Storytelling
- Stream of consciousness (psychology)
- Subconscious
- Substitution (logic)
- Suspicion (emotion)
- Theories
- Thinking processes (theory of constraints)
- Thought disorder
- Thought sonorization (see Glossary of psychiatry)
- Translation
- Truth
- Unconscious mind
- Understanding
- VPEC-T
- wikt:entrained thinking
- wikt:synthesis
- Working memory
- World disclosure

== See also ==
- Artificial intelligence
  - Outline of artificial intelligence
- Human intelligence
  - Outline of human intelligence
- Neuroscience
  - Outline of neuroscience
- Psychology
  - Gestalt psychology (theory of mind)
  - Outline of psychology

Miscellaneous

- Adaptation
- Association of Ideas
- Attacking Faulty Reasoning
- Autistic thinking (see Glossary of psychiatry)
- Backcasting
- Causality
- Chunking (psychology)
- Cognition
- Cognitive biology
- Cognitive computing
- Cognitive deficit
- Cognitive dissonance
- Cognitive linguistics
- Cognitive module
- Cognitive psychology
- Cognitive science
- Cognitive space
- Cognitive style
- Communicating
- Comparative cognition
- Concept-formation
- Conceptual metaphor
- Conceptual thinking
- Conscience
- Consciousness
- Constructive criticism
- Conversation
- Criticism
- Dereistic thinking (see Glossary of psychiatry)
- Design (and re-design)
- Dialectic
- Discovery (observation)
- Distinction (philosophy)
- Distributed cognition
- Distributed multi-agent reasoning system
- Educational assessment
- Emotion
- Empirical knowledge
- Empiricism
- Epistemology
- Evidential reasoning (disambiguation)
- Evidential reasoning approach
- Expectation (epistemic)
- Experimentation
- Explanation
- Extension (semantics)
- Facilitation (business)
- Fantasy
- Fideism
- Figure Reasoning Test
- Fuzzy logic
- Fuzzy-trace theory
- Generalizing
- Gestalt psychology
- Group cognition
- Heuristics in judgment and decision making
- Holism
- Human multitasking
- Human self-reflection
- Hypervigilance
- Identification (information)
- Inductive reasoning aptitude
- Intellect
- Intelligence (trait)
- Intentionality
- Inventing
- Judging
- Kinesthetic learning
- Knowledge management
- Knowledge representation and reasoning
- Language
- Linguistics
- List of cognitive scientists
- List of creative thought processes
- List of emotional intelligence topics
- List of emotions
- List of organizational thought processes
- List of perception-related topics
- Mathematics Mechanization and Automated Reasoning Platform
- Mental function
- Mental model theory of reasoning
- Meta-analytic thinking
- Meta-ethical
- Methodic doubt
- Mimesis
- Mind
- Models of scientific inquiry
- Morphological analysis (problem-solving)
- Natural language processing
- Nonduality
- Nous
- Pattern matching
- Personality psychology
- Persuasion
- Philomath
- Philosophical analysis
- Philosophical method
- Planning
- Po (term)
- Practical reason
- Preconscious
- Prediction
- Procedural reasoning system
- Pseudoscience
- Pseudoskepticism
- Psychological projection
- Psychology of reasoning
- Qualitative Reasoning Group
- Rationality and Power
- Reasoning Mind
- Reasoning system
- Recognition-primed decision
- Reflective disclosure
- Scientific method
- Self-deception
- Semantic network
- Semantics
- Semiotics
- Sensemaking
- Situated cognition
- Situational awareness
- Skepticism
- Source criticism
- Spatial Cognition
- Speculative reason
- Spiral: The Bonds of Reasoning
- Storytelling
- Stream of consciousness (psychology)
- Subconscious
- Substitution (logic)
- Suspicion (emotion)
- Theories
- Thinking processes (theory of constraints)
- Thought disorder
- Thought sonorization (see Glossary of psychiatry)
- Translation
- Truth
- Unconscious mind
- Understanding
- VPEC-T
- wikt:entrained thinking
- wikt:synthesis
- Working memory
- World disclosure

Thinking

- Buckminster Fuller: Thinking Out Loud (documentary)
- Critical-Creative Thinking and Behavioral Research Laboratory
- History of political thinking
- Inquiry: Critical Thinking Across the Disciplines
- Partial concurrent thinking aloud
- Po (lateral thinking)
- Six Thinking Hats
- SolidThinking
- Straight and Crooked Thinking
- Systematic Inventive Thinking
- The Art of Negative Thinking
- The Lake of Thinking
- The Magic of Thinking Big
- The Year of Magical Thinking
- Thinking about Consciousness
- Thinking about the immortality of the crab
- Thinking Allowed
- Thinking processes (Theory of Constraints)
- Thinking Skills Assessment
- Thinking, Fast and Slow
- Torrance Tests of Creative Thinking
- Unified structured inventive thinking
- When You're Through Thinking, Say Yes
- World Thinking Day

Lists

- List of neurobiology topics
- List of cognitive science topics
- List of philosophical theories
- List of psychology topics
- List of cognitive scientists
- Glossary of philosophical isms
- List of cognitive biases
- List of emotions
- List of memory biases
- List of mnemonics
- List of neurobiology topics
- List of psychometric topics
- List of thought processes
