= Outline of psychology =

Overview of and topical guide to psychology

The following outline is provided as an overview of and topical guide to psychology:

Psychology refers to the study of subconscious and conscious activities, such as emotions and thoughts. It is a field of study that bridges the scientific and social sciences and has a huge reach. Its goal is to comprehend individuals and groups by both establishing general principles and researching specific cases. Psychology is the study of people and the reasons for their behavior. It has grown in popularity in the last few decades and is now an undergraduate course at many universities.

There are a variety of psychology branches that people specialize in, as outlined below.

== Branches of psychology ==
=== Basic psychological science ===
- Abnormal psychology
- Applied psychology
- Asian psychology
- Behavioral genetics
- Biological psychology
- Black psychology
- Cognitive psychology
- Comparative psychology
- Conservation psychology
- Criminal psychology
- Critical psychology
- Cultural psychology
- Developmental psychology
- Differential psychology
- Evolutionary psychology
- Experimental psychology
- Forensic developmental psychology
- Group psychology
- Health psychology
- Indigenous psychology
- Mathematical psychology
- Medical psychology
- Motivation
- Music psychology
- Neuropsychology
- Pediatric psychology
- Personality psychology
- Positive psychology
- Psychopharmacology
- Quantitative psychology
- Rehabilitation psychology
- Social psychology
- Transpersonal psychology
- Theoretical psychology

=== Other areas by topic ===
- Behavioral economics
- Child psychopathology
- Feminine psychology
- Indian psychology
- Intelligence
- Subconscious
- Moral psychology
- Psychometrics
- Psycholinguistics
- Psychology of art
- Psychology of religion
- Psychology of science
- Psychology of self
  - Self
- Psychopathology
- Psychopharmacology and substance abuse
- Psychophysics
- Sex and psychology

=== Applied psychology ===
- Anomalistic psychology
- Applied behavior analysis
- Clinical psychology
- Community psychology
- Consumer psychology
- Counseling psychology
- Cyberpsychology
- Ecological psychology
- Educational psychology
- Environmental psychology
- Forensic psychology
- Health psychology
- Human factors psychology
- Industrial and organizational psychology
- Legal psychology
- Media psychology
- Military psychology
- Occupational psychology
- Occupational health psychology
- Political psychology
- Psychoneuroimmunology
- Psychopharmacology
- School psychology
- Sport psychology
- Traffic psychology

=== Psychological schools ===
Psychological schools – some examples of psychological schools follow (the most prominent schools are in bold):

- **Analytical psychology**
- **Behaviorism** (see also Radical behaviourism)
- **Cognitivism**
- Cultural-historical psychology
- Depth psychology
- Descriptive psychology
- Ecological systems theory
- Ego psychology
- Enactivism (psychology)
- Existential psychology
- Functional psychology
- **Gestalt psychology**
- **Humanistic psychology**
- **Individual differences**
- Individual psychology
- Phenomenological psychology
- **Psychoanalysis**
- Structuralism
- Transactional analysis
- Transpersonal psychology

== History of psychology ==
History of psychology

- Timeline of psychology
- Timeline of psychotherapy

== Psychology theories ==
- List of social psychology theories

== Research methods ==
List of psychological research methods

- List of neurological research methods

== Psychological phenomena ==
- Cognitive bias (list)
  - List of memory related cognitive biases
- Emotion (list)
- Perception (index)
- Psychological effects
- Thought (outline)
  - List of thought processes
  - List of organizational thought processes
  - List of decision-making processes
  - List of creative thought processes
  - List of mnemonics
  - Emotional intelligence

=== Mental disorder ===
- DSM-IV codes
- DSM-IV codes (alphabetical)
- Causes of mental disorders
- Classification of mental disorders
- List of mental disorders
  - Anxiety disorders
  - Addiction
    - Video game addiction
- List of mood disorders
- List of neurological disorders
- Outline of autism

== Psychological treatments ==
- List of cognitive–behavioral therapies
- List of therapies
- List of psychotherapies

=== Medicine ===
- Drug
- Lists of drugs
- List of nootropics (smart drugs)

== Psychology education ==
- List of credentials in psychology
- List of schools of psychoanalysis

== Psychology organizations ==
- List of psychology organizations
- Evolutionary psychology research groups and centers
- List of schools of psychoanalysis

== Scholars of psychology (and related) ==
List of psychologists

- List of clinical psychologists
- List of cognitive psychologists
- List of comparative psychologists
- List of developmental psychologists
- List of educational psychologists
- List of evolutionary psychologists
- List of social psychologists

Related

- List of cognitive scientists
- List of fictional psychiatrists
- List of neurologists and neurosurgeons
- List of neuroscientists
- List of psychiatrists
- List of psychoanalytical theorists

== See also ==
- Index of psychology articles
  - Index of cognitive science articles
  - Index of neurobiology articles
  - Index of psychometrics articles
- List of neuroscience topics
- List of counseling topics
- List of neuroimaging software
- List of regions in the human brain
- Neuro-linguistic programming (index)
- Web-based experiments
- List of psychology journals
