= FRT =

FRT may refer to:

== Places ==
- Frt., abbreviation for "Fort" in geography; see Street suffix
- Frant railway station (station code FRT), England, UK
- Frutillar Airport (IATA airport code FRT), Chile
- Frisvadvej (station code Frt), Denmark; see List of railway stations in Denmark
- Freycinet (bioregion code FRT), Tasmanian Shelf Province, Australia
- Poitou-Charentes (ISO 3166-2 region code FR-T), Nouvelle-Aquitaine, France
- Torhout (station code FRT), West Flanders, Belgium; see List of railway stations in Belgium

== Groups ==
- Federally recognized tribe, in the United States
- Aerofreight Airlines (ICAO airline code FRT), a Russian airline; see List of defunct airlines of Russia
- Factor Racing (UCI team code FRT), Slovenian professional bicycle racing team
- Federal Realty Investment Trust (stock ticker FRT), a U.S. real estate investment trust
- Finbond Group Limited (stock ticker FRT), see List of companies traded on the JSE
- Società per le Ferrovie Regionali Ticinesi (FRT; Italian: Ticino Regional Rail Company), predecessor of the Ferrovie Autolinee Regionali Ticinesi (Regional Bus and Rail Company of Ticino)
- Fries Research & Technology GmbH, part of Silicon Saxony
- Furness Railway Trust, Lancashire, England, UK
- Río Tinto Foundation (FRT; Spanish: Fundación Río Tinto), Spanish cultural nonprofit
- Romanian Tennis Federation (FRT; Romanian: Federația Română de Tenis)

== Biology, psychology, medicine ==
- Functional Reach Test for limits of stability
- Figure Reasoning Test, in IQ testing
- Flippase recognition target, in genetic modification
- Free-radical theory of ageing

== Computing, electronics, electrics, telecommunications ==
- Facial recognition technology
- Fault ride through, see low-voltage ride-through
- Fast Reselect Trigger, in TETRA

== Weaponry ==
- Firearms Reference Table, in the Canadian Firearms Program
- Forced Reset Trigger, in firearms

== Other uses ==
- Kiai language (ISO 639-3: frt)
- Farringtonite (mineral symbol Frt), see List of mineral symbols
- Fixed radius transition, in Performance-based navigation
- Floating raft technology, also known as deep water culture, in hydroponic farming
- Free return trajectory of a spacecraft
- Front (Frt), in linguistics; see List of glossing abbreviations
- Future Reality Tree, in theory of constraints
