= Yellow hat =

Yellow hat may refer to:

- Yellow Hat school, the Gelug school of Tibetan Buddhism
- Yellow hat, in de Bono's Six Thinking Hats
- Gabriel Nassif, nicknamed YellowHat, French professional card player
- Jewish hat, a pointed hat worn by Jews in medieval Europe that was often yellow

== See also ==
- Hard hat
