= Positive thinking =

Positive thinking or Positive Thinking may refer to:

== Common uses ==
- New Thought, a new religious movement that coalesced in the United States in the early 19th century
- Optimism, an attitude reflecting a belief or hope that the outcome of some specific endeavor, or outcomes in general, will be positive, favorable, and desirable
- Positive mental attitude, the importance of positive thinking as a contributing factor of success
- Positive psychology, a field of psychological theory and research of optimal human functioning of people, groups, and institutions

== Arts, entertainment, and media ==
- Positive Thinking (magazine), an American magazine
- Positive Thinking..., a 1998 album by Acoustic Alchemy
- Positive Thinking, a 2016 album by the Pack A.D.
- "Positive Thinking", a 1976 song by Morecambe and Wise

== See also ==
- The Power of Positive Thinking, a 1952 book by Norman Vincent Peale
- The Power of Positive Thinking (EP), a 1990 EP by Nomeansno
