= Brian Derby =

English scientist (born 1957)

Brian Derby FIMMM (born 1957) is professor of materials science at Manchester University. He has been at the forefront of research into inkjet printing and 3D bioprinting, winning the Edward de Bono Medal for Original Thinking in 2007 for his work on Printing Skin and Bones: using inkjet printing technology to fabricate complex tissue scaffolds on which cells can be grown.

== Early life ==
Derby was born in 1957 and educated at Bedford Modern School. He graduated with first class honours from Jesus College, Cambridge in 1978. Derby then studied at Wolfson College, Cambridge where he obtained his PhD in 1981.

== Career ==
Derby spent one year working at the Centre d'Etudes Nucleaire de Grenoble as an ESA Fellow before spending two years in the Engineering Department of Cambridge University as a research fellow. He worked at the Department of Materials at the University of Oxford as a research fellow (1983–1998), became lecturer and reader in materials engineering at Oxford and later director of the Oxford Centre for Advanced Materials and Composites.

Derby was appointed professor in materials science at the Materials Science Centre of Manchester University in 1999. He was elected a member of the World Academy of Ceramics in 2004.

Derby's research interests span a wide range with a focus on the processing, structure and mechanical properties in relation to ceramics, glasses, biomaterials, nanostructured materials and implants. He has been at the forefront of research into the development of inkjet printing as a manufacturing tool. He has particular interest in developing methods of characterising materials and processes in conjunction with industry and research groups across the world.

Derby won the Edward de Bono Medal for Original Thinking in 2007 for his Printing Skin and Bones project: using inkjet printing technology to fabricate complex tissue scaffolds on which cells can be grown. The objective is to 'use inkjet printing to build 3-D structures that contain both the living cells and the scaffold materials: the ability to print skin and bone and, ultimately, whole artificial organs is a possibility'.

== Honours ==
- Gold Medal (Graduate Student) of the International Astronautical Federation (1979) for best paper presented by a Graduate Student at the IAF Congress, Munich, 1979
- Elected Member of the World Academy of Ceramics (2004)
- Edward de Bono Medal for Original Thinking (2007)

== Editorships ==
- Associate editor, Acta Materialia (1998–2001)
- Associate editor, Journal of the American Ceramic Society (2000–present)
- Founding editorial board, Materials Science and Engineering
- Series editor, Engineering Materials and Processes, Springer Verlag

== Publications ==
2013

- I. M. Beshtawi, R. Akhtar, M. C. Hillarby, C. O'Donnell, X. Zhao, A. Brahma, F. Carley, B. Derby, and H. Radhakrishnan: ‘Scanning Acoustic Microscopy for Mapping the Microelastic Properties of Human Corneal Tissue’, Current Eye Research, 38(4), 437–444
- A. Carisey, R. Tsang, A. M. Greiner, N. Nijenhuis, N. Heath, A. Nazgiewicz, R. Kemkemer, B. Derby, J. Spatz, and C. Ballestrem: ‘Vinculin Regulates the Recruitment and Release of Core Focal Adhesion Proteins in a Force-Dependent Manner’, Current Biology, 23(4), 271–281
- A. M. Lewis, B. Derby, and I. A. Kinloch: ‘Influence of gas phase equilibria on the chemical vapour deposition of graphene’, ACS nano, 7(4), 3104–3117

2012

- Chopra, K., et al., Gel-cast glass-ceramic tissue scaffolds of controlled architecture produced via stereolithography of moulds. Biofabrication. 4(4)
- Derby, B., Printing and Prototyping of Tissues and Scaffolds. Science. 338(6109): p. 921–926
- Dou, R. and B. Derby, Formation of Coffee Stains on Porous Surfaces. Langmuir. 28(12): p. 5331–5338
- Ubal, S., et al., Continuous Deposition of a Liquid Thread onto a Moving Substrate. Numerical Analysis and Comparison With Experiments. Journal of Fluids Engineering-Transactions of the Asme. 134(2)
- Wang, T.M., et al., Inkjet printed carbon nanotube networks: the influence of drop spacing and drying on electrical properties. Journal of Physics D-Applied Physics. 45(31)
- Zhao, X.G., et al., Multi-Layer Phase Analysis: Quantifying the Elastic Properties of Soft Tissues and Live Cells with Ultra-High-Frequency Scanning Acoustic Microscopy. IEEE Transactions on Ultrasonics Ferroelectrics and Frequency Control. 59(4): p. 610–620

2011

- Akhtar, R., et al., Characterizing the elastic properties of tissues. Materials Today. 14(3): p. 96–105
- Derby, B., Inkjet printing ceramics: From drops to solid. Journal of the European Ceramic Society. 31(14): p. 2543–2550
- Di Biase, M., et al., Photopolymerization of Pluronic F127 diacrylate: a colloid-templated polymerisation. Soft Matter. 7(10): p. 4928–4937
- Di Biase, M., et al., Inkjet printing and cell seeding thermoreversible photocurable gel structures. Soft Matter. 7(6): p. 2639–2646
- Dou, R. and B. Derby, Deformation mechanisms in gold nanowires and nanoporous gold. Philosophical Magazine. 91(7–9): p. 1070–1083
- Dou, R., et al., Ink-Jet Printing of Zirconia: Coffee Staining and Line Stability. Journal of the American Ceramic Society. 94(11): p. 3787–3792
- Goodman, O. and B. Derby, The mechanical properties of float glass surfaces measured by nanoindentation and acoustic microscopy. Acta Materialia. 59(4): p. 1790–1799
- Graham, H.K., et al., Localised micro-mechanical stiffening in the ageing aorta. Mechanisms of Ageing and Development. 132(10): p. 459–467

2010

- Cook, C C; Wang, T and Derby B;, Chem. Commun. (2010) 46, 5452–5454
- Derby, B; Inkjet printing of functional and structural materials – fluid property requirements, feature stability and resolution, Annu. Rev. Mater. Res. (2010) 40, 395–414
- Stringer, J and Derby, B; The formation and stability of lines produced by inkjet printing”, Langmuir, (2010) 26, 10365-10372
- Dou, R; Xu, B and Derby B; High strength nanoporous silver produced by inkjet printing, Scripta Mater. (2010) 63, 308–311
- Dou, R and Derby B; Strain gradients and the strength of nanoporous gold, J. Mater. Res. (2010) 25, 746–753

2009

- Diu, R and Derby B; A universal scaling law for the strength of metal micropillars and nanowires, Scripta Materialia (2009) 61, 524–527 (2009)
- LeClere, D J; Thompson, G E and Derby B; Conical tungsten stamps for the replication of pore arrays in anodic aluminium oxide films, Nanotechnology (2009) 20, 245304
- Stringer, J and Derby B; Limits to feature size and resolution in inkjet printing, J. Europ. Ceram. Soc. (2009) 29, 913–918
- Akhtar, R; Schwarzer, N; Sherratt, M J; Watson, R E B; Graham, H K; Trafford, A W; Mummery, P M and Derby, B; Nanoindentation of histological specimens: Mapping the elastic properties of soft tissues, J. Mater Res. (2009) 24, 638–646

2008

- Wu, H Z; Roberts, S G and Derby B; Residual stress distributions around indentations and scratches in polycrystalline Al2O3 and Al2O3/SiC nanocomposites measured using fluorescence probes, Acta Mater. (2008) 56, 140–149
- Derby, B; Bioprinting: inkjet printing of proteins, cells and cell-containing hybrid structures, J. Mater. Chem. (2008) 18, 5717 – 5721
- Wang, T; Patel, R and Derby, B; Manufacture of 3-dimensional objects by reactive inkjet printing, Soft Matter, (2008) 4, 2513–2518
- Wu, H Z; Roberts, S G and Derby, B; Residual stress distributions around indentations and scratches in polycrystalline Al2O3 and Al2O3/SiC nanocomposites measured using fluorescence probes, Acta Mater. (2008) 56, 140–149
- Akhtar, R; Sherrat, M J; Bierswich, N; Derbyb B; Mummery P M; Qatson R E B and Schwarzer N, Nanoindentation of histological specimens using an extension of the Oliver and Pharr method. MRS Symp. Proc., (2008) 1097E, GG01-09
- Dou, Rui and Derby, Brian; The strength of gold nanowire forests, Scripta Materialia (2008) 59, 151–154
- Saunders, Rachel E.; Gough, Julie E.; Derby, Brian: Delivery of human fibroblast cells by piezoelectric drop-on-demand inkjet printing, Biomaterials (2007), 29(2), 193–203

2007

- Derby, Brian: Correlations for single-crystal elastic constants of compound semiconductors and their representation in isomechanical groups, Physical Review B: Condensed Matter and Materials Physics (2007), 76(5), 054126/1-054126/12

2006

- Anggono, Juliana; Derby, Brian: Mullite formation from the pyrolysis of aluminium-loaded polymethylsiloxanes: The influence of aluminium powder characteristics, Journal of the European Ceramic Society (2006), 26(7), 1107–1119
- Mironov Vladimir; Reis Nuno; Derby Brian: Review: bioprinting: a beginning, Tissue engineering (2006), 12(4), 631–4
- Smith, P. J.; Shin, D.-Y.; Stringer, J. E.; Derby, B.; Reis, N: Direct ink-jet printing and low temperature conversion of conductive silver patterns, Journal of Materials Science (2006), 41(13), 4153–4158

2005

- Wang, Tianming; Derby, Brian: Ink-jet printing and sintering of PZT, Journal of the American Ceramic Society (2005), 88(8), 2053–2058
- Reis, Nuno; Ainsley, Chris; Derby, Brian: Ink-jet delivery of particle suspensions by piezoelectric droplet ejectors, Journal of Applied Physics (2005), 97(9), 094903/1-094903/6
