= Dissociation =

Dissociation, in the wide sense of the word, is an act of disuniting or separating a complex object into parts.

Dissociation may also refer to:

- Dissociation (chemistry), general process in which molecules or ionic compounds (complexes, or salts) split into smaller particles, usually in a reversible manner
- Dissociation (neuropsychology), identification of the neural substrate of a particular brain function through various methods
- Dissociation (psychology), an experience of having one's attention and emotions detached from the environment
- Dissociation (rhetoric), a rhetorical device in which the speaker separates a notion considered to form a unitary concept into two new notions to affect an audience in some way
- Dissociation (album), by the Dillinger Escape Plan, 2016
- Dissociation: Progress in the Dissociative Disorders (1988–1997), a medical journal published by International Society for the Study of Trauma and Dissociation

== See also ==
- "Disassociation", a 2021 song by the Rions
- Dissociative, a class of hallucinogen
