= Epistemological pluralism =

School of thought in epistemology

Epistemological pluralism is a term used in philosophy, economics, and virtually any field of study to refer to different ways of knowing things; different epistemological methodologies for attaining a fuller description of a particular field. A particular form of epistemological pluralism is dualism, for example, the separation of methods for investigating mind from those appropriate to matter (see mind–body problem). By contrast, monism is the restriction to a single approach, for example, reductionism, which asserts the study of all phenomena can be seen as finding relations to some few basic entities.

Epistemological pluralism is to be distinguished from ontological pluralism, the study of different modes of being, for example, the contrast in the mode of existence exhibited by "numbers" with that of "people" or "cars".

In the philosophy of science epistemological pluralism arose in opposition to reductionism to express the contrary view that at least some natural phenomena cannot be fully explained by a single theory or fully investigated using a single approach.

In research, epistemological pluralism refers to an epistemological approach that accepts different ways of knowing, allowing for interdisciplinary frameworks and collaboration. This perspective values various theories and perspectives on how things are, seeing them all as constitutive of reality.

In mathematics, the variety of possible epistemological approaches includes platonism ("mathematics as an objective study of abstract reality, no more created by human thought than the galaxies"), radical constructivism (with restriction upon logic, banning the proof by reductio ad absurdum and other limitations), and many other schools of thought.

In economics controversy exists between a single epistemological approach to economics and a variety of approaches. "At midcentury, the neoclassical approach achieved near-hegemonic status (at least in the United States), and its proponents sought to bring all kinds of social phenomena under its uniform explanatory umbrella. The resistance of some phenomena to neoclassical treatment has led a number of economists to think that alternative approaches are necessary for at least some phenomena and thus also to advocate pluralism." An extensive history of these attempts is provided by Sent.

== See also ==
- Epistemological anarchism
- Interdisciplinarity
- Methodological individualism
- Multimethodology
- Trichotomy (philosophy)
- VPEC-T
- Scientism
