= L game =

Abstract two-player strategy game

L game board and starting setup, with neutral pieces shown as black discs

The L game is a simple abstract strategy board game invented by Edward de Bono. It was introduced in his book The Five-Day Course in Thinking (1967).

== Description ==
The L game is a two-player game played on a board of 4×4 squares. Each player has a 3×2 L-shaped tetromino, and there are two 1×1 neutral pieces.

=== Rules ===
On each turn, a player must first move their L piece, and then may optionally move either one of the neutral pieces. The game is won by leaving the opponent unable to move their L piece to a new position.

Pieces may not overlap or cover other pieces, or let the pieces off the board. On moving the L piece, it is picked up and then placed in empty squares anywhere on the board. It may be rotated or even flipped over in doing so; the only rule is that it must end in a different position from the position it started—thus covering at least one square it did not previously cover. To move a neutral piece, a player simply picks it up then places it in an empty square anywhere on the board.

== Strategy ==
One basic strategy is to use a neutral piece and one's own piece to block a 3×3 square in one corner, and use a neutral piece to prevent the opponent's L piece from swapping to a mirror-image position. Another basic strategy is to move an L piece to block a half of the board, and use the neutral pieces to prevent the opponent's possible alternate positions.

These positions can often be achieved once a neutral piece is left in one of the eight killer spaces on the perimeter of the board. The killer spaces are the spaces on the perimeter, but not in a corner. On the next move, one either makes the previously placed killer a part of one's square, or uses it to block a perimeter position, and makes a square or half-board block with one's own L and a moved neutral piece.

== Analysis ==
All positions, Red to move, where Red will lose to a perfect Blue, and maximum number of moves remaining for Red. By looking ahead one move and ensuring one never ends up in any of the above positions, one can avoid losing.

All possible final positions, Blue has won

In a game with two perfect players, neither will ever win or lose. The L game is small enough to be completely solvable. There are 2296 different possible valid ways the pieces can be arranged, not counting a rotation or mirror of an arrangement as a new arrangement, and considering the two neutral pieces to be identical. Any arrangement can be reached during the game, with it being any player's turn. Each player has lost in 15 of these arrangements, if it is that player's turn. The losing arrangements involve the losing player's L piece touching a corner. Each player will also soon lose to a perfect player in an additional 14 arrangements. A player will be able to at least force a draw (by playing forever without losing) from the remaining 2267 positions.

Even if neither player plays perfectly, defensive play can continue indefinitely if the players are too cautious to move a neutral piece to the killer positions. If both players are at this level, a sudden-death variant of the rules permits one to move both neutral pieces after moving.

== See also ==
- Tetromino

== Reviews ==
- Games & Puzzles #30

== Other sources ==
- de Bono, Edward (1967). "The L Game: Strategic Thinking". The Five-Day Course in Thinking. Basic Books Inc. pp. 149–206. LCCN 67027438.
- Parlett, David (1999). "The L-Game". The Oxford History of Board Games. Oxford University Press Inc. pp. 161–62. ISBN 0-19-212998-8.
- Pritchard, D. B. (1982). "The L Game". Brain Games. Penguin Books Ltd. pp. 107–12. ISBN 0-14-00-5682-3.
