= Robert H. Thouless =

British parapsychologist (1894–1984)

Robert Henry Thouless
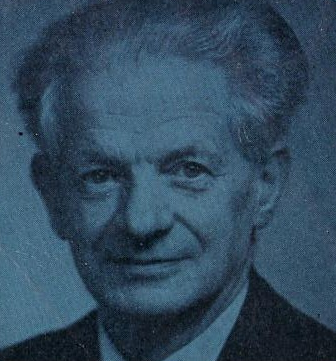
- Born: 15 July 1894
- Died: 25 September 1984 (aged 90)
- Spouse: Priscilla Gorton
- Children: David Thouless

Academic background
- Education: University of Cambridge
- Thesis: Nature of religious experience and its significance for human thought (1923)

Academic work
- Discipline: Psychology; Parapsychology
- Institutions: University of Manchester; University of Glasgow; University of Cambridge

Robert Henry Thouless (15 July 1894 – 25 September 1984) was an English psychologist and parapsychologist. He is best known as the author of Straight and Crooked Thinking (1930, 1953), which describes flaws in reasoning and argument.

== Career ==
He studied at Cambridge University where he earned B.A. hons in 1914, an M.A. in 1919 and a PhD in 1922. He was a lecturer in psychology at the universities of Manchester, Glasgow and a Fellow of Corpus Christi College in the University of Cambridge. He wrote on parapsychology and conducted experiments in card-calling and psychokinesis. His own experiments did not confirm the results of J. B. Rhine and he criticised the experimental protocols of previous experimenters. He is credited (along with Bertold Wiesner) with introducing the word psi as a term for parapsychological phenomena in a 1942 article in the British Journal of Psychology. He served as president of the Society for Psychical Research from 1942 to 1944. Thouless identified as a "Christian psychologist". He questioned the alleged visions of Jesus Christ that the mystic Julian of Norwich reported to have experienced and concluded they were the result of hallucinations.

Thouless was a friend of the philosopher Ludwig Wittgenstein and attended his lectures. Alongside C.H. Waddington, he and Wittgenstein would meet up every week and discuss philosophy.

== Attempt to prove dead could communicate with the living ==
In 1948 Thouless created a test that he thought could provide evidence that he could communicate with living people after his death. One way of testing this, which had been tried before, was to ask dying people to write a message that would be sealed, then ask a medium to try to contact the deceased for the message. The weakness in this approach was that the medium might have been shown the message before the seance, which would call into question the integrity of the claim. In order to control for this weakness, Thouless proposed enciphering his messages in a way that was practically unbreakable without the keys. The enciphered messages would be published while he was alive, but he would not divulge the keys. Upon his eventual death, he planned to pass the keys to the living, making the enciphered message readable and providing evidence of the success of the experiment.

Thouless called his experiment "A Test of Survival" and published it in the Proceedings of the Society for Psychical Research. He initially published two ciphers, Passage I and Passage II. Passage I was broken in about two weeks by an anonymous codebreaker. Thouless quickly published a third cipher, Passage III, which was much more difficult. Thouless also published a description of the methods used for Passages II and III, as he assumed they were practically unbreakable without the keys.

The Passage II ciphertext read:

INXPH CJKGM JIRPR FBCVY WYWES NOECN SCVHE GYRJQ TEBJM TGXAT TWPNH CNYBC FNXPF LFXRV QWQL

The Passage III ciphertext read:

BTYRR OOFLH KCDXK FWPCZ KTADR GFHKA HTYXO ALZUP PYPVF AYMMF SDLR UVUB

The Survival Research Foundation based in Miami offered a reward of $1000 to anyone who could break the cipher within three years of Thouless' death. Thouless died in 1984 but no solution came, and Passages II and III remained unbroken well past the three-year deadline.

In 1995 Passage III was broken without help from the beyond, by James Gillogly and Larry Harnisch, who wrote cryptanalysis software to crack the double-enciphered playfair cipher used. The deciphered message read "THIS IS A CIPHER WHICH WILXL NOT BE READ UNLESXS I GIVE THE KEYWORDS X". The X characters are to separate double characters, and to make the length of the message even, both of which are required in standard playfair encipherment. The keywords were black and beauty.

Passage II survived until 2019, when it was cracked by Richard Bean, a Research Fellow in the School of Information Technology and Electrical Engineering at The University of Queensland. Passage II used a variant of a book cipher, which means that it used a published phrase in its encipherment. Bean cracked it by writing a computer script that tried out 37,000 books from Project Gutenberg and ranked the potential solutions based on expected English letter frequencies. The source book was Selected Poems of Francis Thompson, and the particular entry used was the poem "The Hound of Heaven”. The deciphered message read "A number of successful experiments of this kind would give strong evidence for survival."

== Reception ==
His An Introduction to the Psychology of Religion (1923, reprinted 1961) received a mixed reception from academics. One criticism of the book was the over-reliance of Freud's psychoanalyst approach to the subject. Professor James E. Dittes wrote that despite the obsolete Freudian views it is a useful elementary guide to the psychology of religion.

Psychologist John Beloff commenting on Thouless and his parapsychological studies wrote:

"Although his own ESP experiments were not notably successful, he made an original contribution to the study of PK (psychokinesis) with dice, using himself as subject. Unlike Rhine, however, he never lost interest in the age old topic of an afterlife... He even devised a coded message, which he took with him to the grave, in the hope that he might demonstrate survival by revealing the code posthumously through a medium. No such message, however, has yet been received."

Psychologist L. Börje Löfgren has criticised Thouless for endorsing the mentalist Frederick Marion as a genuine psychic. He suggested that "Thouless is an honest man, but his powers of self-deception must be rather considerable."

== Personal life ==
Robert Thouless married Priscilla Gorton, an English teacher, and was the father of the Nobel Prize-winning physicist David Thouless.

== Publications ==
- An Introduction to the Psychology of Religion (1923, 1961)
- The Lady Julian: A Psychological Study (1924)
- Social Psychology: A Text Book for Students of Economics (1925)
- Control of the Mind (1929)
- How to Think Straight (1948)
- Experimental Psychical Research (1963)
- Mind and Consciousness in Experimental Psychology (1963)
- Rationality and Prejudice (1964)
- Straight and Crooked Thinking (1968)
- From Anecdote to Experiment in Psychical Research (1972)
