= Josephine Burns de Bono =

Maltese political activist and feminist

Josephine Burns de Bono née Burns (1908–1996) was a Maltese political activist and feminist.

== Biography ==
She was born to Hugh Burns and Laura Rosina Ada Agius, and the sister of journalist Hugh Burns of the Times of Malta. She was married in 1931 to the physician Joseph Edward de Bono, and was the mother of four boys. The eldest, Antony [1932-2020], was one of the first cardiac surgeons in Malta. The youngest, David [1947-1999] was Professor of Medicine at Leicester University Her second son Edward de Bono (1933–2021), is credited with inventing 'lateral thinking'. She was active as a journalist in London in the 1920s, and later worked at the Times of Malta.

She was a co-founder of the Women of Malta Association in 1944, and served as the President of the organization from the foundation in 1944, until women's suffrage was introduced in 1947. She played an important part in the activism for the introduction of women's suffrage in Malta. She wrote: "The right of women to vote and to stand as Parliamentary candidates was legally recognised in England and America as a result of the excellence of women's work during the Great War of 1914-1918. To-day after nearly four and a half years of war, women in Malta are becoming conscious that they have earned the same civic recognition".

Women's suffrage and the right to be elected to political office were included in the MacMichael Constitution, which was finally introduced on 5 September 1947. After the approval of the reform in parliament, Josephine Burns de Bono resigned from her post as President of the Women of Malta Association with the statement that the purpose of the organization had now been achieved.

Her letter of resignation was published in the Times of Malta on 24 September 1947:

"... It has been a revelation to work with you, and our association for a noble ideal, the opening of the gates of public life to Maltese women, has been marked by signal success under the will of Heaven ... Through the cooperation of our friends in every walk of life, and through the support of the Labour Party and the GWU in the Assem-bly. We were privileged to see our long campaign in the press and in the Assembly crowned with victory, a victory doubly dear as the final voice had, as Sir Harold MacMichael observes, no dissentient note from an Assembly wholly converted to the great Cause ... I believe that the Association has achieved the objects laid down in its original charter, and that the country can be best served by the mutual coop-eration of men and women in all spheres of public life".

Josephine was a writer for Queen Magazine. In 1951 she was a runner up (to Muriel Spark) in the Observer Short Story Competition with "Christmas, Malta 1942".
