= Pseudoskepticism =

Position that appears to be skeptic but is actually dogmatic

Pseudoskepticism (also spelled as pseudoscepticism) is a philosophical or scientific position that appears to be that of skepticism or scientific skepticism but in reality is a form of dogmatism.

== Nineteenth and early twentieth centuries ==
An early use of the word was in self-denigration: on 31 August 1869, Swiss philosopher Henri-Frédéric Amiel wrote in his diary:

My instinct is in harmony with the pessimism of Buddha and of Schopenhauer. It is a doubt which never leaves me, even in my moments of religious fervor. Nature is indeed for me a Maïa; and I look at her, as it were, with the eyes of an artist. My intelligence remains skeptical. What, then, do I believe in? I do not know. And what is it I hope for? It would be difficult to say. Folly! I believe in goodness, and I hope that good will prevail. Deep within this ironical and disappointed being of mine there is a child hidden — a frank, sad, simple creature, who believes in the ideal, in love, in holiness, and all heavenly superstitions. A whole millennium of idyls sleeps in my heart; I am a pseudo-skeptic, a pseudo-scoffer.

It soon acquired its usual meaning where a claimed skeptic is accused of excessive sureness in turning initial doubts into certainties. In 1908 Henry Louis Mencken wrote on Friedrich Nietzsche's criticism of philosopher David Strauss that:

Strauss had been a preacher but had renounced the cloth and set up shop as a critic of Christianity. He had labored with good intentions, no doubt, but the net result of all his smug agnosticism was that his disciples were as self-satisfied, bigoted, and prejudiced in the garb of agnostics as they had been before as Christians. Nietzsche's eye saw this and in the first of his little pamphlets "David Strauss, der Bekenner und der Schriftsteller" ("David Strauss, the Confessor and the Writer"), he bore down on Strauss's bourgeoise pseudo-skepticism most savagely. This was 1873.

Professor of Philosophy at the University of Illinois, Frederick L. Will used the term "pseudo-skepticism" in 1942. Alasdair MacIntyre writes:

[Frederick] Will was no exception. He began as an analytical philosopher, distinguishing different uses of language with the aim of showing that certain traditional philosophical problems need no longer trouble us, once we have understood how to make the relevant linguistic distinctions. The enemies were two: the philosophical skeptic who poses these false problems and the philosopher who thinks that the skeptic needs to be answered. So in "Is there a Problem of Induction?" (Journal of Philosophy, 1942) it is two senses of "know" that are to be distinguished: "All the uneasiness, the pseudo-skepticism and the pseudo-problem of induction, would never appear if it were possible to keep clear that 'know' in the statement that we do not know statements about the future is employed in a very special sense, not at all its ordinary one.

Notre Dame Professor of English, John E. Sitter used the term in 1977 in a discussion of Alexander Pope: "Pope's intent, I believe, is to chasten the reader's skepticism — the pseudo-skepticism of the overly confident 'you' ... "

== Truzzi ==
In 1987, Marcello Truzzi revived the term specifically for arguments which use scientific-sounding language to disparage or refute given beliefs, theories, or claims, but which in fact fail to follow the precepts of conventional scientific skepticism. He argued that scientific skepticism is agnostic to new ideas, making no claims about them but waiting for them to satisfy a burden of proof before granting them validity. Pseudoskepticism, by contrast, involves "negative hypotheses"—theoretical assertions that some belief, theory, or claim is factually wrong—without satisfying the burden of proof that such negative theoretical assertions would require.

In 1987, while working as a professor of sociology at Eastern Michigan University, Truzzi gave the following description of pseudoskeptics in the journal Zetetic Scholar (which he founded):

In science, the burden of proof falls upon the claimant; and the more extraordinary a claim, the heavier is the burden of proof demanded. The true skeptic takes an agnostic position, one that says the claim is not proved rather than disproved. He asserts that the claimant has not borne the burden of proof and that science must continue to build its cognitive map of reality without incorporating the extraordinary claim as a new "fact." Since the true skeptic does not assert a claim, he has no burden to prove anything. He just goes on using the established theories of "conventional science" as usual. But if a critic asserts that there is evidence for disproof, that he has a negative hypothesis—saying, for instance, that a seeming psi result was actually due to an artifact—he is making a claim and therefore also has to bear a burden of proof...

Both critics and proponents need to learn to think of adjudication in science as more like that found in the law courts, imperfect and with varying degrees of proof and evidence. Absolute truth, like absolute justice, is seldom obtainable. We can only do our best to approximate them.

— Marcello Truzzi, "On Pseudo-Skepticism", Zetetic Scholar, 12/13, pp3-4, 1987

Truzzi attributed the following characteristics to pseudoskeptics:

1. Denying, when only doubt has been established
2. Double standards in the application of criticism
3. The tendency to discredit rather than investigate
4. Presenting insufficient evidence or proof
5. Assuming criticism requires no burden of proof
6. Making unsubstantiated counter-claims
7. Counter-claims based on plausibility rather than empirical evidence
8. Suggesting that unconvincing evidence provides grounds for completely dismissing a claim

He characterized true skepticism as:

1. Acceptance of doubt when neither assertion nor denial has been established
2. No burden of proof to take an agnostic position
3. Agreement that the corpus of established knowledge must be based on what is proved, but recognising its incompleteness
4. Even-handedness in requirement for proofs, whatever their implication
5. Accepting that a failure of a proof in itself proves nothing
6. Continuing examination of the results of experiments even when flaws are found

== Subsequent usage ==
Susan Blackmore, who lost her initial belief in parapsychology and in 1991 became a CSICOP fellow, later described what she termed the "worst kind of pseudoskepticism":

There are some members of the skeptics' groups who clearly believe they know the right answer prior to inquiry. They appear not to be interested in weighing alternatives, investigating strange claims, or trying out psychic experiences or altered states for themselves (heaven forbid!), but only in promoting their own particular belief structure and cohesion.

Hugo Anthony Meynell from the Department of Religious Studies at the University of Calgary, labels the "extreme position that all significant evidence supporting paranormal phenomena is a result of deception or lies" as pseudoskepticism.

While Truzzi's characterization was aimed at the holders of majority views whom he considered were excessively impatient of minority opinions, the term has been used to describe advocates of minority intellectual positions who engage in pseudoskeptical behavior when they characterize themselves as "skeptics" despite cherry picking evidence that conforms to a preexisting belief. Thus according to Richard Cameron Wilson, some advocates of AIDS denial are indulging in "bogus scepticism" when they argue in this way. Wilson argues that the characteristic feature of false skepticism is that it "centres not on an impartial search for the truth, but on the defence of a preconceived ideological position". Examples include climate change denial and Moon landing denial.

== See also ==
- Agnosticism
- Argument from ignorance
- Debunker
- Denialism
- Pseudoscience
- Pseudorationalism
- Scientism
- The New Inquisition
