= The Mechanism of Mind =

Book by Edward de Bono

- First edition cover
- Author: Edward de Bono
- Publisher: Jonathan Cape
- Publication date: January 1969
- ISBN: 0-224-61709-5

The book The Mechanism of Mind by Edward de Bono details the underpinning model of the mind that leads to the many thinking skills developed by its author, including lateral thinking.

== The Model ==
The model detailed in the book, and referred to again in many of Edward de Bono's other books, is one of Neurones networked together by many stronger and weaker connections and activating as a result of input stimulus or stimulation from other neurones that are themselves active. Neurones that are active together form stronger connections and are more likely to activate together in the future. The model is a Self-organizing system.

It is not intended that the model be a detailed analysis of how human brains are structured but the broadest possible abstraction that can provide a meaningful understanding of the nature of thinking. Nor is it intended to build a cohesive theory but to provide the reader with a collection of concepts that will illuminate further thinking about thinking.

More detailed models and theories specifically about the brain can be found under the topic of Cognitive Science and connectionism.

== Behaviour of the Model ==
The characteristic behaviour of the system is shown to create and reinforce patterns. The current set of patterns in the system determines how new experiences are integrated. Attention tends to flow along well-worn paths and patterns have large catchment areas. Novel experiences are often lost as attention flows down old paths that are in some way similar to the new experience. Sometimes starting at a different point in an established pattern can lead to a jump out of that pattern to a new one.

These behaviours are analogues to human thinking behaviours such as circular thinking, prejudice, polarisation, insight and humour.

== Consequences ==
The mind as modelled has some severe limitations.

From The Mechanism of Mind page 182:

The limitations of the special memory surface can take one of three forms:
1. Inability to carry out certain functions.
2. Actual error.
3. Inefficient use of information available to it.

Thinking modes such as Natural Thinking, Logical Thinking, Mathematical Thinking and Lateral Thinking, are examined in light of these limitations to see how they may be addressed. The techniques of Lateral Thinking are shown to be specifically designed to bypass these limitations.

== See also ==
- Cognitive science
- Lateral Thinking
- Self-awareness
