= Dissociation (rhetoric) =

Rhetorical device where speaker splits concept considered unitary

Dissociation is a rhetorical device in which the speaker separates a notion considered by the audience to form a unitary concept into two new notions.

Kathryn Olson, Director of the Rhetorical Leadership Program at the University of Wisconsin-Milwaukee, explains that by doing this, the speaker fundamentally changes the reality of the thought system in question by creating a disjunction between what was an integrated concept to begin with. According to M.A. van Rees, dissociation is a two step process of distinction and definition: distinction divides a single concept into two new notions for the audience and definition replaces the original term or concept with two new terms, each with their own definitions.

This process is rhetorically effective when a rhetor presents a particular concept in a light that is favorable to his/her interests by dissociating a term with any notions that do not serve the rhetor's purpose. According to Øyvind Ihlen, the rhetor attempts to "remove an incompatibility that arises from confrontation between propositions" to better affect an audience's beliefs. Defining a situation through dissociation, when done correctly, authoritatively declares the two resulting concepts distinct and rules out any further argument.
