= Adaptive reasoning =

Problem solving strategy

Adaptive reasoning refers to a problem solving strategy that adapts thinking to address a problem as it changes and evolves.

== Some definitions ==
Adaptive reasoning may also refer to the adaptation of thought processes, problem solving strategies, and conceptual framework, in response and anticipation of the changing nature of the problem being considered.

- "Adaptive reasoning refers to the capacity to think logically about the relationships among concepts and situations and to justify and ultimately prove the correctness of a mathematical procedure or assertion. Adaptive reasoning also includes reasoning based on pattern, analogy or metaphor."
- "Capacity for logical thought, reflection, explanation and justification."
- "The ability of an agent to intelligently adapt its behavior, both short-term and long-term in response to the changing needs of its problem-solving situation"

== See also ==
- Problem solving
- List of thought processes
