= Critical-Creative Thinking and Behavioral Research Laboratory =

Research institute at Başkent University, Ankara, Turkey

- Type: Science Laboratory
- Established: 2002
- Location: Ankara, Turkey

Critical-Creative Thinking and Behavioral Research Laboratory (ELYADAL) was founded in March 2002 as a branch in the Faculty of Economics and Administrative Sciences in Başkent University, Ankara, Turkey. Academicians and students in different disciplines like psychology, social science, philosophy of science, scientific method, political science, business management and economics have convened to conduct scientific research and produce applications of science pertaining to human behavior as it is manifested in varying contexts. ELYADAL's perspective regarding scientific inquiry can be summarized as "disseminating the scientific knowledge accumulated by following curiosity through asking questions and answering them by means of scientific research."

ELYADAL has two branches to organize interests in two broad topics. The first branch is related to make research on, develop programs to train on, and to provide information about critical thinking and creative thinking for students, faculty members, and organizations. The second branch is organized around behavior, its antecedents and consequences, and research conducted in an interdisciplinary fashion is welcomed.

== Brief history ==
The process of establishment have started in March 2002. A core group of academicians have called for colleagues and students to participate in the new-founding laboratory. Following a number of meetings with the initial respondents, ELYADAL Research Group has started its activities on April 13, 2002. In order to test and form the interaction dynamics of the group, three subgroups have been established to work independently on three topics of interest. These topics were chosen so that no group member had previous in-depth knowledge or formal education about them, enabling equidistant amateurship in the beginning. The topics were the number pi in mathematics, the microscopic organism Volvox colony in biology, and the black hole in physics. The studies of the groups were disseminated by a then-established popular scientific magazine named PiVOLKA (an anagram name including syllables from the three topics). Mini-group studies on natural scientific issues then become a one-step hurdle for the selection of prospective adjoiners and PiVOLKA became a source of dissemination and open forum to students and academicians in other universities as well.

The ongoing studies by members of ELYADAL include critical thinking, political and economical psychology research and publications, convention papers, the PiVOLKA peer-reviewed quarterly scholarly publication, a booklet about research methods-academic writing, a booklet about statistics, seminars and panels on various topics.

ELYADAL has 28 papers that are published in various journals, 33 papers that are presented in various seminars and conferences, 16 talks that are broadcast in media about psychology, social psychology, critical thinking, creative thinking, science against pseudoscience, etc.

== Selected publications ==
- PiVOLKA (2002–2006) - Peer-reviewed quarterly scholarly publication
- Statistical Formulas and Tables (2005) - Booklet
- Research methods and Academic writing Rules (2002, 2004) - Booklet
- Perception of drug addiction - published in Journal of Addictive Behaviors (2005)
- Lay theories for depression - published in Journal of Social Behavior and Personality (2003)

== See also ==
- Critical thinking
- Creative thinking
- Psychology
- Social psychology
