= Frutillar Airport =

- IATA: FRT; ICAO: SCFR

Summary
- Airport type: Public
- Serves: Frutillar, Chile
- Elevation AMSL: 469 ft / 143 m
- Coordinates: 41°07′45″S 73°03′52″W

Map
- Location of Frutillar Airport in Chile

Runways
Direction	Length		Surface
Direction	m	ft	Surface
18/36	758	2,487	Grass
- Source: Landings.com GCM Google Maps

Frutillar Airport (IATA: FRT, ICAO: SCFR) is an airport serving Frutillar, a town at the western end of Llanquihue Lake in the Los Lagos Region of Chile.

The runway lies alongside the Pan-American Highway just to the west of Frutillar, and has an additional 120 metres (390 ft) of grass overrun on the south end.

The Puerto Montt VOR-DME (Ident: MON) is 17.9 nautical miles (33.2 km) south of the airport.

== See also ==
- Transport in Chile
- List of airports in Chile
