= Evidential reasoning =

Evidential reason or evidential reasoning may refer to:

- Probabilistic logic, a combination of the capacity of probability theory to handle uncertainty with the capacity of deductive logic to exploit structure
- "Evidential reason", a type of reason (argument) in contrast to an "explanatory reason"
- Evidential reasoning approach, in decision theory, an approach for multiple criteria decision analysis (MCDA) under uncertainty
