= List of neurological research methods =

There are numerous types of research methods used when conducting neurological research, all with the purpose of trying to view the activity that occurs within the brain during a certain activity or behavior. The disciplines within which these methods are used is quite broad, ranging from psychology to neuroscience to biomedical engineering to sociology. The following is a list of neuroimaging methods:

- Electroencephalography (EEG)

- Quantitative electroencephalography (QEEG)
- Stereoelectroencephalography (SEEG)

- Functional magnetic resonance imaging (fMRI)
- Magnetoencephalography (MEG)
- Near-infrared spectroscopy (NIRS)
- Positron emission tomography (PET)
- Single-unit recording
- Transcranial direct-current stimulation (TDCS)
- Transcranial magnetic stimulation (TMS)

== See also ==
- neuroimaging
- functional neuroimaging
