= Pseudorationalism =

Pseudorationalism was the label given by economist and philosopher Otto Neurath to a school of thought that he was heavily critical of, which relies on an erroneous vision of the process of thinking and moral action. He made these criticisms throughout many of his writings, but primarily in his 1913 paper "The lost wanderers of Descartes and the auxiliary motive" and later to a lesser extent in his 1935 "Pseudorationalismus der Falsifikation".

== A criticism of the naive conception of reason ==
In "The lost wanderers of Descartes and the auxiliary motive", Neurath writes that "Descartes was of the opinion that, in the field of theory, by forming successive series of statements that one has recognised as definitely true, one could reach a complete picture of the world". Moreover, especially in the Principles of Philosophy, Descartes sharply distinguished thinking and action, and rejected the possibility of having provisional rules in the moral and practical field, which is an assumption Neurath rejects.

Descartes' approach can thus be metaphorically described as "lost wanderers," suggesting a solitary and introspective journey towards certainty and knowledge, starting from a point of complete skepticism.

Neurath introduced the parable of the boat in another article, 'Protocol statements' (1932), and not in his 1913 paper. This metaphor describes science and knowledge as a never-ending voyage where we must repair our ship at sea, without ever being able to start anew from the ground up. It emphasizes the collective, provisional, and piecemeal nature of scientific endeavor, contrasting sharply with Descartes' pursuit of an indubitable foundation for knowledge.:

There is no way to establish fully secured, neat protocol statements as starting points of the sciences. There is no tabula rasa. We are like sailors who have to rebuild their ship on the open sea, without ever being able to dismantle it in dry-dock and reconstruct it from its best components.

Thus, pseudorationalism can be understood as a misunderstanding of Descartes' principles, and can lead to a form of cynicism. "Pseudorationalism leads partly to self-deception, partly to hypocrisy". It is a "belief in powers that regulate existence and foretell the future" and according to Neurath, is similar to superstion. It can be identified to a special form of naive scientism.

== A criticism of "rational absolutism" ==
The second paper mentioning pseudorationalism was a review of Popper's first book, Logik der Forschung (The Logic of Scientific Discovery), contrasting this approach with his own view of what rationalism should properly be. Neurath criticises the cumulative conception of knowledge endowed by Popper. For instance, Popper writes that:

For a theory which has been well corroborated can only be superseded by one of a higher level of universality; that is, by a theory which is better testable and which, in addition, contains the old, well corroborated theory—or at least a good approximation to it. It may be better, therefore, to describe that trend—the advance towards theories of an ever higher level of universality—as ‘quasi-inductive’.

Neurath's criticism addresses the fact that the various steps of gravitational theory can barely be understood as approximations of one theory. He is relying on Pierre Duhem's work The Aim and Structure of Physical Theory.

Another aspect of his critique suggests that Popper advocates for a form of traditional absolutism, in which all scientific theories progressively converge towards a comprehensive understanding of the world. According to Neurath, pseudorationalists, much more successful in the 1930's than it was before, make the mistake of assuming a complete picture of reality, an impossibility which leads them to further false assumptions.

Consequently, the necessity for calculation in kind ushered in a demand for an alternative approach to practical reasoning. This new approach diverged significantly from the precise, astronomical ideals epitomized by Laplace in science, as well as from the rationalist and individualist principles associated with Descartes in philosophy. He termed this departure "pseudorationality," a concept he later identified within Popper's perspectives.

Rationalism is thus an epistemological and political doctrine, destined to fight theses avatars of rationalism.

Rationalism sees its chief triumph in the clear recognition of the limits of actual insight. I tend to derive the widespread tendency towards pseudo-rationalism from the same unconscious endeavours as the tendency towards superstition.

Pseudorationalism also refers to Neurath's conception of economics and his criticism of the misusage of the concept of rationality.
