= Six Thinking Hats =

1985 book by Maltese Dr. Edward de Bono

- Author: Edward de Bono
- Subject: Psychology
- Genre: Self-help
- Publisher: Little, Brown and Company
- Publication date: 1985
- Pages: 207
- ISBN: 0-316-17791-1
- Preceded by: Masterthinker's Handbook (1985)
- Followed by: I Am Right, You Are Wrong (1991)

Six Thinking Hats is a book written by Dr. Edward de Bono and published in 1985. The associated idea of parallel thinking provide a means for groups to plan thinking processes in a detailed and cohesive way, and in doing so to think together more effectively.

== Underlying principles ==
The premise of the method is that the human brain thinks in a number of distinct ways which can be deliberately challenged, and hence planned for use in a structured way allowing one to develop tactics for thinking about particular issues. De Bono identifies six distinct directions in which the brain can be challenged. In each of these directions the brain will identify and bring into conscious thought certain aspects of issues being considered (e.g. gut instinct, pessimistic judgement, neutral facts).

A compelling example presented is sensitivity to "mismatch" stimuli. This is presented as a valuable survival instinct because, in the natural world, the thing that is out of the ordinary may well be dangerous. This mode is identified as the root of negative judgement and critical thinking.

Colored hats are used as metaphors for each direction. Switching to a direction is symbolized by the act of putting on a colored hat, either literally or metaphorically. This metaphor of using an imaginary hat or cap as a symbol for a different thinking direction was first mentioned by De Bono as early as 1971 in his book Lateral Thinking for Management when describing a brainstorming framework. These metaphors allow for a more complete and elaborate segregation of the thinking directions. The six thinking hats indicate problems and solutions about an idea the thinker may come up with.

Similarly, "The Five Stages of Thinking" method—a set of tools corresponding to all six thinking hats—first appears in his CoRT Thinking Programme in 1973:

HAT	OVERVIEW	TECHNIQUE
BLUE	"The Big Picture" & Managing	CAF (Consider All Factors); FIP (First Important Priorities)
WHITE	"Facts & Information"	Information
RED	"Feelings & Emotions"	Emotions and Ego
BLACK	"Negative"	PMI (Plus, Minus, Interesting); Evaluation
YELLOW	"Positive"	PMI
GREEN	"New Ideas"	Concept Challenge; Yes, No, Po aka lateral thinking

== Strategies and programs ==
Having identified the six modes of thinking that can be accessed, distinct programs can be created. These are sequences of hats which encompass and structure the thinking process toward a distinct goal. A number of these are included in the materials provided to support the franchised training of the six hats method; however it is often necessary to adapt them to suit an individual purpose. Also, programs are often "emergent", which is to say that the group might plan the first few hats then the facilitator will see what seems to be the right way to go.

Sequences always begin and end with a blue hat; the group agrees together how they will think, then they do the thinking, then they evaluate the outcomes of that thinking and what they should do next. Sequences (and indeed hats) may be used by individuals working alone or in groups. Example programs are shown below, each hat is typically used for approximately 2 minutes at a time—although at the start of a process an extended white hat session is common to get everyone onto the same page, and the red hat is recommended to be used for a very short period to get a visceral gut reaction—about 30 seconds, and in practice often takes the form of dot-voting.

ACTIVITY	HAT SEQUENCE
Initial Ideas	Blue, White, Green, Blue
Choosing between alternatives	Blue, White, (Green), Yellow, Black, Red, Blue
Identifying Solutions	Blue, White, Black, Green, Blue
Quick Feedback	Blue, Black, Green, Blue
Strategic Planning	Blue, Yellow, Black, White, Blue, Green, Blue
Process Improvement	Blue, White, White (Other People's Views), Yellow, Black, Green, Red, Blue
Solving Problems	Blue, White, Green, Red, Yellow, Black, Green, Blue
Performance Review	Blue, Red, White, Yellow, Black, Green, Blue

== Use ==
Typically, a project will begin with an extended white hat action, as facts are assembled. Thereafter, each hat is used for a few minutes at a time only, except the red hat which is limited to a very short 30 seconds or so to ensure that it is an instinctive gut reaction, rather than a form of judgement. This pace may have a positive impact on the thinking process.

De Bono believed that the key to a successful use of the Six Thinking Hats methodology was the deliberate focusing of the discussion on a particular approach as needed during the meeting or collaboration session. For instance, a meeting may be called to review a particular problem and to develop a solution for the problem. The Six Thinking Hats method could then be used in a sequence to first explore the problem, then develop a set of solutions, and to finally choose a solution through critical examination of the solution set.

The meeting may start with everyone assuming the Blue hat to discuss how the meeting will be conducted and to develop the goals and objectives. The discussion may then move to Red hat thinking in order to collect opinions and reactions to the problem. This phase may also be used to develop constraints for the actual solution such as who will be affected by the problem and/or solutions. Next the discussion may move to the (Yellow then) Green hat in order to generate ideas and possible solutions. Next the discussion may move between White hat thinking as part of developing information and Black hat thinking to develop criticisms of the solution set.

Because everyone is focused on a particular approach at any one time, the group tends to be more collaborative than if one person is reacting emotionally (Red hat) while another person is trying to be objective (White hat) and still another person is being critical of the points which emerge from the discussion (Black hat). The hats aid individuals in addressing problems from a variety of angles, and focus individuals on deficiencies in the way that they approach problem solving.

In 2005, the tool found some use in the United Kingdom innovation sector, where it was offered by some facilitation companies and trialled within the United Kingdom's civil service.

== Criticism ==
Frameworks For Thinking is an evaluation of 42 popular thinking frameworks conducted by a team of researchers. Regarding Edward de Bono they write,

[he] is more interested in the usefulness of developing ideas than proving the reliability or efficacy of his approach. There is sparse research evidence to show that generalised improvements in thinking performance can be attributed to training in the use of CoRT [Cognitive Research Trust] or Thinking Hats tools.

== See also ==
- Coloured hat
- Educational psychology – Branch of psychology concerned with the scientific study of human learning
- Intelligence – Ability to perceive, infer, retain or apply information
- Lateral thinking – Manner of solving problems
- Team Role Inventories – Test to measure preference for nine Team Roles
- Wiktionary:thinking cap – A metaphorical headgear worn by a person to assist them in thinking.
