= Inductive reasoning aptitude =

Inductive reasoning aptitude (also called differentiation or inductive learning ability) measures how well a person can identify a pattern within a large amount of data. It involves applying the rules of logic when inferring general principles from a constellation of particulars.

Measurement is generally done in a timed test by showing four pictures or words and asking the test taker to identify which of the pictures or words does not belong in the set. The test taker is shown a large number of sets of various degrees of difficulty. The measurement is made by timing how many of these a person can properly identify in a set period of time. The test resembles the game 'Which of These Is Not Like the Others'.

Inductive reasoning is very useful for scientists, auto mechanics, system integrators, lawyers, network engineers, medical doctors, system administrators and members of all fields where substantial diagnostic or data interpretation work is needed. Inductive reasoning aptitude is also useful for learning a graphical user interface quickly, because highly inductive people are very good at seeing others' categorization schemes.

== Example ==
Here is an example question:

Find the set of letters that doesn’t belong with the other sets.

A) cdef       B) mnpo        C) hikj        D) vwyx

The correct answer is...

"A", as it is the only set with four letters in sequential order, although set "D" arguably differs by both lacking a vowel and being separated from the previous set by more than one intervening letter.

== See also ==
- Aptitude test
- Theory of multiple intelligences
