= Straight and Crooked Thinking =

Book by Robert H. Thouless

- Author: Robert H. Thouless
- Language: English
- Genre: Logic, psychology and education
- Publisher: Simon & Schuster
- Publication date: 1930
- Media type: Print (hardcover and paperback)
- Pages: 261 pp
- ISBN: 0-330-24127-3
- OCLC: 1230940
- Dewey Decimal: 160
- LC Class: BC108 .T48 1974

Straight and Crooked Thinking, first published in 1930, revised in 1953, and again in 1974 is a book by Robert H. Thouless which describes, assesses and critically analyses flaws in reasoning and argument. Before Robert's death in 1984 he asked his grandchild C. R. Thouless to create an updated version of the book with contemporary examples. The 4th edition came out in 1990 with very limited run and a 5th edition was published in 2011. The latter book includes discussions of post 9/11 middle eastern terrorism with Western responses and the 2008 Subprime mortgage crisis. Robert Thouless described it as a practical manual, rather than a theoretical one.

== Synopsis ==
The 2nd edition discusses 38 deceptive techniques used in dishonest argumentation. There are 37 in the 5th edition and the ordering and descriptions do not match exactly. Many but not all of these map into well known fallacies. Appendix I of the 2nd edition provides page #s where they are discussed. Appendix 1 of the 5th locates the discussion by chapter. The following samples are based on the numbering from the 2nd edition.

- No. 3. proof by example, biased sample, cherry picking
- No. 6. ignoratio elenchi: "red herring"
- No. 9. false compromise/middle ground
- No. 12. argument in a circle
- No. 13. begging the question
- No. 17. equivocation
- No. 18. false dilemma: black and white thinking
- No. 19. continuum fallacy (fallacy of the beard)
- No. 21. ad nauseam: "argumentum ad nauseam" or "argument from repetition" or "argumentum ad infinitum"
- No. 25. style over substance fallacy
- No. 28. appeal to authority
- No. 31. thought-terminating cliché
- No. 36. special pleading
- No. 37. appeal to consequences
- No. 38. appeal to motive

Some of the tricks that do not map into fallacies are

- No. 23. Making one's opponent angry so that they make mistakes
- No. 29. Softening opposition by starting with simpler agreed upon propositions
- No. 32. Equivocating pro and con so that no decision gets made

== See also ==
- List of cognitive biases
- List of common misconceptions
- List of fallacies
- List of memory biases
- List of topics related to public relations and propaganda
