= Dogma =

Beliefs accepted by members of a group without question

Dogma, in its broadest sense, is any belief held definitively and without the possibility of reform. It may be in the form of an official system of principles or doctrines:

- of a religion, such as Judaism, Christianity (Roman Catholicism, Protestantism) or Islam
- of the positions of a philosopher or of a philosophical school, such as Stoicism or Marxism
- of the postulates or political axioms of political belief-systems such as fascism, socialism, progressivism, liberalism, or conservatism

In the pejorative sense, the term "dogma" refers to enforced decisions, such as those of aggressive political interests or authorities. More generally, it is applied to some strong belief that its adherents are not willing to discuss rationally. This attitude is named as a dogmatic one, or dogmatism, and is often used to refer to matters related to religion, though this pejorative sense strays far from the formal sense in which it is applied to religious belief. The pejorative sense is not limited to theistic attitudes alone and is often used with respect to political or philosophical dogmas.

== Etymology ==
The word dogma was adopted in the 17th century from Latin: dogma, lit. 'philosophical tenet or principle', derived from the Ancient Greek: δόγμα, romanized: dogma, lit. 'opinion, belief, judgement' from the Ancient Greek: δοκεῖ, romanized: dokeî, lit. 'it seems that...'. The English plural dogmata is based on the Latin: dogmata, though dogmas may be more commonly used in English.

== In philosophy ==
=== Pyrrhonism ===
In Pyrrhonism, "dogma" refers to assent to a proposition about a non-evident matter. The main principle of Pyrrhonism is expressed by the word acatalepsia, which connotes the ability to withhold assent from doctrines regarding the truth of things in their own nature; against every statement its contradiction may be advanced with equal justification. Consequently, Pyrrhonists withhold assent with regard to non-evident propositions, i.e., dogmas. Pyrrhonists argue that dogmatists, such as the Stoics, Epicureans, and Peripatetics, have failed to demonstrate that their doctrines regarding non-evident matters are true.

=== Modern epistemology ===
According to Immanuel Kant and Søren Kierkegaard, religious dogmas are subjective assertions (by definition).

== In religion ==
=== Christianity ===
In Christianity, a dogma is a belief communicated by divine revelation and defined by the Church. The organization's formal religious positions may be taught to new members or simply communicated to those who choose to become members. It is rare for agreement with an organization's formal positions to be a requirement for attendance, though membership may be required for some church activities.

In the narrower sense of the church's official interpretation of divine revelation, theologians distinguish between defined and non-defined dogmas, the former being those set out by authoritative bodies such as the Roman Curia for the Catholic Church, the latter being those which are universally held but have not been officially defined, the nature of Christ as universal redeemer being an example. The term originated in late ancient Greek philosophy legal usage, in which it meant a decree or command, and came to be used in the same sense in early Christian theology. Protestants to differing degrees are less formal about doctrine, and often rely on denomination-specific beliefs, but seldom refer to these beliefs as dogmata. The first unofficial institution of dogma in the Christian church was by Saint Irenaeus in his Demonstration of Apostolic Teaching, which provides a 'manual of essentials' constituting the 'body of truth'.

==== Catholicism and Eastern Christianity ====
For Catholicism and Eastern Christianity, the dogmata are contained in the Nicene Creed and the canon laws of two, three, seven, or twenty-one ecumenical councils (depending on whether one is Church of the East, Oriental Orthodox, Eastern Orthodox, or Roman Catholic). These tenets are summarized by John of Damascus in his Exact Exposition of the Orthodox Faith, which is the third book of his main work, titled The Fount of Knowledge. In this book he takes a dual approach in explaining each article of the faith: one, directed at Christians, where he uses quotes from the Bible and, occasionally, from works of other Church Fathers, and the second, directed both at members of non-Christian religions and at atheists, for whom he employs Aristotelian logic and dialectics.

The decisions of fourteen later councils that Catholics hold as dogmatic and a small number of decrees promulgated by popes exercising papal infallibility (for examples, see Immaculate Conception and Assumption of Mary) are considered as being a part of the Catholic Church's sacred body of dogma.

=== Judaism ===
In the Jewish commentary tradition, dogma is a principle by which the Rabbanim can try the proofs of faith about the existence of God and truth; dogma is what is necessarily true for rational thinking. In Jewish Kabbalah, a dogma is an archetype of the Pardes or Torah Nistar, the secrets of Bible. In the relation between "logical thinking" and "rational Kabbalah" the "Partzuf" is the means to identify "dogma".

=== Buddhism ===
View or position (Sanskrit: दृष्टि, romanized: dṛṣṭi; Pali: diṭṭhi) is a central idea in Buddhism that corresponds with the Western notion of dogma. In Buddhist thought, a view is not a simple, abstract collection of propositions, but a charged interpretation of experience which intensely shapes and affects thought, sensation, and action. Having the proper mental attitude toward views is therefore considered an integral part of the Buddhist path, as sometimes correct views need to be put into practice and incorrect views abandoned, while at other times all views are seen as obstacles to enlightenment.

=== Islam ===
In the context of Islam, dogma is best translated as عقيدة (ʿAqīda).

ʿAqīda refers to the core tenets of Islamic belief, such as faith in Allah, the prophets, the afterlife, and other essential doctrines. It is a fundamental aspect of Islamic theology, and different Islamic schools (e.g., Ashʿarī, Māturīdī, and Salafī) have varying interpretations of ʿAqīda while agreeing on its foundational principles.

== See also ==
- Axiom – Statement that is taken to be true
- Central dogma of molecular biology – Explanation of the flow of genetic information within a biological system
- Doctrine#Religious usage – Codification of beliefs
- Dogmatic theology – Theology of theoretical official truths
- Eclecticism – Conceptual approach that draws upon multiple theories, styles, or ideas
- Escalation of commitment – Human behavior pattern in which the participant takes on increasing risk
- Trust (social science) – The belief that another person will commit to what is expected
- Pseudoskepticism – Position that appears to be skeptic but is actually dogmatic
- Standard social science model – Alleged model of social science thought

== Bibliography ==
- Blackburn, Simon (2016). "Dogma". The Oxford Dictionary of Philosophy. Oxford University Press. ISBN 978-0-19-873530-4.
- Fuller, Paul (2005). The Notion of Diṭṭhi in Theravāda Buddhism: The Point of View (PDF). Routledge. Archived from the original (PDF) on February 26, 2015.
- McKim, D.K. (2001). "Dogma". In Elwell, Walter A. (ed.). Evangelical Dictionary of Theology. Baker Academic. ISBN 978-0-8010-2075-9.
- O'Collins, Gerald (1983). "Dogma". In Richardson, Alan; Bowden, John (eds.). The Westminster Dictionary of Christian Theology. Westminster John Knox Press. ISBN 978-0-664-22748-7.
- Stanglin, K.D. (2009). "Dogma". In Dyrness, William A.; Kärkkäinen, Veli-Matti (eds.). Global Dictionary of Theology: A Resource for the Worldwide Church. InterVarsity Press. ISBN 978-0-8308-7811-6.
