= Po (lateral thinking) =

Signals provocation

Po is a word that precedes and signals a provocation. A provocation is an idea which moves thinking forward to a new place from where new ideas or solutions may be found. Po is also an interjection, aimed at obtaining further clarifications without agreeing or disagreeing.

== Etymology ==
The term po was first created by Edward de Bono as part of a lateral thinking technique to suggest forward movement, that is, making a statement and seeing where it leads to. It is an extraction from words such as hypothesis, suppose, possible and poetry, all of which supposedly indicate forward movement and contain the syllable "po." Po can be taken to refer to any of the following: provoking operation, provocative operation or provocation operation.

Additionally, in Maori, the word "po" refers to the original chaotic state of formlessness, from which evolution occurred. Edward de Bono argues that this context as well applies to the term.

== Usage ==
=== Initiating a proposal ===
For example, in response to "sales are dropping off because our product is perceived as old fashioned":

1. po: Change the colour of the packaging
2. po: Flood the market with even older-looking products to make it seem more appealing
3. po: Call it retro
4. po: Sell it to old people
5. po: Sell it to young people as a gift for old people
6. po: Open a museum dedicated to it
7. po: Market it as a new product

Some of the above ideas may be impractical, not sensible or not business-minded. The value of these ideas is that they move thinking from a place where it is entrenched to a place where it can move.

The above ideas might develop into:

1. po: Change the colour of the packaging
  - update the product casing to bring it up to date (electronic goods can often do this)
2. po: Flood the market with even older-looking products to make it seem more appealing
  - take a cut down version and release it as an older cheaper one to make this product seem like the top of the line
3. po: Call it retro
  - instead of retro say "tried and tested" or "industry standard"
4. po: Sell it to old people
  - good idea
5. po: Sell it to young people as a gift for old people
  - good idea
6. po: Open a museum dedicated to it
  - exhibit only your competitor's products
  - sell this product in the museum
  - make the experience educational within your sector
  - open a café
  - accept group bookings
  - add a theme park
7. po: Market it as a new product
  - give it a new name and call it state of the art

The point of these examples is that an initial po may seem silly, but a further development may seem very good indeed. The intermediate silly idea is a necessary step to find the good idea.
