= Index of psychometrics articles =

Articles related to psychometrics (measuring intelligence and cognitive traits) include:

- Intelligence quotient
- Myers-Briggs Type Indicator
- Big Five personality traits
- Personality tests
- Enneagram of Personality
- Scholastic Aptitude Test
