= Figure Reasoning Test =

Non-verbal test

The Figure Reasoning Test (FRT) is an intelligence test created by John Clifford Daniels in the late 1940s. It consists of two forms, Form A and Form B. Each form contains 45 questions, with the test taker given 20 minutes to complete each form. Forms A and B are designed for individuals aged 15 years and older.

The test is used by several Mensa national groups, including those in Bulgaria, Denmark, Finland, Greece, Italy, North Macedonia, Norway, Romania, Slovenia, South Africa, and Sweden, for admission purposes. To qualify for Mensa, it is not necessary to complete both forms of the test. Each form independently provides an IQ percentile based on the raw score achieved by the test taker. Mensa Norway provides an online test that resembles the format of the Figure Reasoning Test. The high-IQ society Intertel also accepts the FRT for admission purposes, requiring performance at or above the 99th percentile - stricter than Mensa's cut-off of the 98th percentile.

A variant of the test, called the Figure Reasoning Test - Junior (FRT-J), is designed for children and adolescents aged 10 to 15 years. The FRT-J consists of two example tasks followed by 25 test items, and is available in two parallel forms. Test takers are given 15 minutes to complete each form.
