= Positive Thinking (magazine) =

Positive Thinking Magazine was launched in 2005 as a secular subsidiary of Guideposts.

Its title was based on the book The Power of Positive Thinking by Norman Vincent Peale. Its editorial offices were in New York City.

The magazine ceased publication.
