= Distinction (philosophy) =

Fundamental philosophical abstraction; the recognition of difference

Distinction, the fundamental philosophical abstraction, involves the recognition of difference.

In classical philosophy, there were various ways in which things could be distinguished. The merely logical or virtual distinction, such as the difference between concavity and convexity, involves the mental apprehension of two definitions, but which cannot be realised outside the mind, as any concave line would be a convex line considered from another perspective. A real distinction involves a level of ontological separation, as when squirrels are distinguished from llamas (for no squirrel is a llama, and no llama is a squirrel). A real distinction is thus different than a merely conceptual one, in that in a real distinction, one of the terms can be realised in reality without the other being realised.

Later developments include Duns Scotus's formal distinction, which developed in part out of the recognition in previous authors that there need to be an intermediary between logical and real distinctions.

Some relevant distinctions to the history of Western philosophy include:

- Necessity and contingency
- Inductive and Deductive

== Distinctions in contemporary thought ==
=== Analytic–synthetic distinction ===
While there are anticipation of this distinction prior to Kant in the British Empiricists (and even further in Scholastic thought), it was Kant who introduced the terminology. The distinction concerns the relation of a subject to its predicate: analytic claims are those in which the subject contains the predicate, as in "All bodies are extended." Synthetic claims bring two concepts together, as in "All events are caused." The distinction was recently called into question by W.V.O. Quine, in his paper "Two Dogmas of Empiricism."

=== A priori and a posteriori ===
The origins of the distinction are less clear, and it concerns the origins of knowledge. A posteriori knowledge arises from, or is caused by, experience. A priori knowledge may come temporally after experience, but its certainty is not derivable from the experience itself. Saul Kripke was the first major thinker to propose that there are analytic a posteriori knowledge claims.

== Notable distinctions in historical authors ==
=== Aristotle ===
Aristotle makes the distinction between actuality and potentiality. Actuality is a realisation of the way a thing could be, while potency refers simply to the way a thing could be. There are two levels to each: matter itself can be anything, and becomes something actually by causes, making it something which then has the ability to be in a certain way, and that ability can then be realised. The matter of an ax can be an ax, then is made into an ax. The ax thereby is able to cut, and reaches a new form of actuality in actually cutting.

=== Aquinas ===
The major distinction Aquinas makes is that of essence and existence. It is a distinction already in Avicenna, but Aquinas maps the distinction onto the actuality/potentiality distinction of Aristotle, such that the essence of a thing is in potency to the existence of a thing, which is that thing's actuality.

=== Kant ===
In Kant, the distinction between appearance and thing-in-itself (German: Ding an sich) is foundational to his entire philosophical project. The distinction separates the way a thing appears to us on the one hand, and the way a thing really is.

== See also ==
- Use-mention distinction – Distinction between using a word and mentioning it
- Type-token distinction – Distinguishing objects and classes of objects
- Internal–external distinction – Concept in ontology
- Distinction without a difference – Type of logical fallacy
