= Edward de Bono =

Maltese physician (1933–2021)

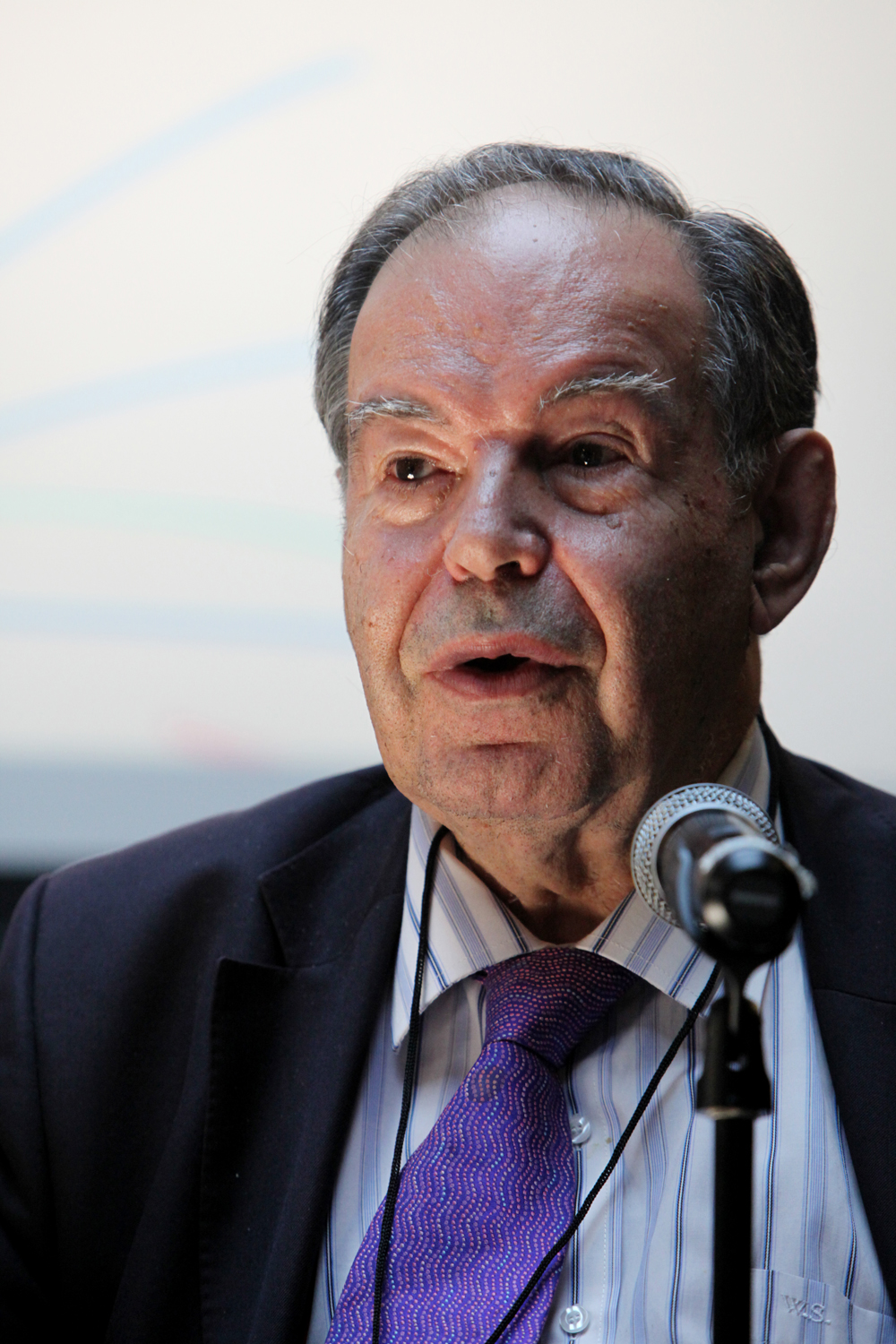
- De Bono in 2009
- Born: 19 May 1933; Malta
- Died: 10 June 2021 (aged 88)
- Known for: Lateral thinking
- Spouse: Josephine Hall-White (m. 1971, divorced)
- Children: 3 sons, 1 daughter
- Mother: Josephine Burns de Bono
- Website: www.debono.com

Edward Charles Francis Publius de Bono (19 May 1933 – 10 June 2021) was a Maltese physician and commentator. He originated the term lateral thinking, and wrote many books on thinking, including Six Thinking Hats.

== Life and career ==
Edward Charles Francis Publius de Bono was born in Malta on 19 May 1933. He was the son of Josephine Burns de Bono.

Educated at St. Edward's College, Malta, he then gained a medical degree from the University of Malta. Following this, he proceeded as a Rhodes Scholar in 1955 to Christ Church, Oxford, where he gained an MA in psychology and physiology. He represented Oxford in polo and set two canoeing records. He then gained a PhD degree in medicine from Cambridge University.

De Bono held faculty appointments at the universities of Oxford, Cambridge, London and Harvard. He was a professor at the University of Malta, the University of Pretoria, the University of Central England (now called Birmingham City University) and Dublin City University. De Bono held the Da Vinci Professor of Thinking chair at the University of Advancing Technology in Tempe, Arizona, US. He was one of the 27 Ambassadors for the European Year of Creativity and Innovation 2009.

The originator of the term 'Lateral Thinking', de Bono wrote 85 books with translations into 47 languages. He taught his thinking methods to government agencies, corporate clients, organizations and individuals, privately or publicly in group sessions. He promoted the World Center for New Thinking (2004–2011), based in Malta, which applied Thinking Tools to solution and policy design on the geopolitical level. His book The Use of Lateral Thinking (1967) was described as one of the 12 most influential books since World War II by The Sunday Times.

In 1976, de Bono took part in a radio debate for the BBC with British philosopher A. J. Ayer, on the subject of effective democracy.

Starting on Wednesday 8 September 1982, the BBC ran a series of 10 weekly programmes entitled de Bono's Thinking Course. In the shows, he explained how thinking skills could be improved by attention and practice. The series was repeated the following year. A book with the same title accompanied the series. In May 1994, he gave a half-hour Opinions lecture televised on Channel 4 and subsequently published in The Independent as "Thinking Hats On". In 1995, he created a futuristic documentary film, 2040: Possibilities by Edward de Bono, depicting a lecture to an audience of viewers released from a cryogenic freeze for contemporary society in the year 2040.

Convinced that a key way forward for humanity is a better language, he published The Edward de Bono Code Book in 2000. In this book, he proposed a suite of new words based on numbers, where each number combination represents a useful idea or situation that currently does not have a single-word representation. For example, de Bono code 6/2 means "Give me my point of view and I will give you your point of view." Such a code might be used in situations where one or both of the two parties in a dispute are making insufficient effort to understand the other's perspective.

=== Parallel thinking ===
Parallel thinking is a term coined by de Bono. Parallel thinking is described as a constructive alternative to: "adversarial thinking"; debate; and the approaches exemplified by Socrates, Plato, and Aristotle (whom de Bono refers to as the "Greek gang of three" (GG3)). In general, parallel thinking is a further development of the well-known lateral-thinking processes, focusing even more on explorations—looking for what can be rather than for what is.

Parallel thinking is defined as a thinking process where focus is split in specific directions. When done in a group it effectively avoids the consequences of the adversarial approach (as used in courts). In adversarial debate, the objective is to prove or disprove statements put forward by the parties (normally two). This is also known as the dialectic approach. In Parallel Thinking, practitioners put forward as many statements as possible in several (preferably more than two) parallel tracks. This leads to exploration of a subject where all participants can contribute, in parallel, with knowledge, facts, feelings, etc. Crucial to the method is that the process is done in a disciplined manner, and that all participants play along and contribute in parallel. Thus each participant must stick to the specific track. Six Thinking Hats is an example of its implementation.

== Other ideas ==
De Bono invented the L game, which he introduced in his book The Five-Day Course in Thinking.

In 2000, de Bono advised a UK Foreign Office committee that the Arab–Israeli conflict might be due, in part, to low levels of zinc found in people who eat unleavened bread (e.g. pita flatbread). De Bono argued that low zinc levels leads to heightened aggression. He suggested shipping out jars of Marmite to compensate.

Edward de Bono argued that companies could raise money just as governments now do – by printing it. He put forward the idea of private currency as a claim on products or services produced by the issuer.

== Critiques ==
In the Handbook of Creativity, Robert J. Sternberg writes,

Equally damaging to the scientific study of creativity, in our view, has been the takeover of the field, in the popular mind, by those who follow what might be referred to as a pragmatic approach. Those taking this approach have been concerned primarily with developing creativity, secondarily with understanding it, but almost not at all with testing the validity of their ideas about it. [...] Perhaps the foremost proponent of this approach is Edward De Bono, whose work on lateral thinking and other aspects of creativity has had what appears to be considerable commercial success.

Frameworks For Thinking is an evaluation of 42 popular thinking frameworks conducted by a team of researchers. Regarding Edward de Bono they write,

[he] is more interested in the usefulness of developing ideas than proving the reliability or efficacy of his approach. There is sparse research evidence to show that generalised improvements in thinking performance can be attributed to training in the use of CoRT [Cognitive Research Trust] or Thinking Hats tools. An early evaluation of CoRT reported significant benefits for Special Educational Needs (SEN) pupils... However, in a more recent study with Australian aboriginal children (Ritchie and Edwards, 1996), little evidence of generalisation was found other than in the area of creative thinking.

Summarising de Bono's 1985 work in Conflicts: A Better Way to Resolve Them, M. Afzalur Rahim, distinguished professor of management at Western Kentucky University with a particular focus on conflict management in organizations, gives his view that, as pertains to Rahim's own field of research, "De Bono's approach to total elimination of conflict is no different from the approaches of the classicists. This approach to dealing with conflict is completely out of tune with modern thinking and, therefore, unsatisfactory."

== Personal life ==
In 1971 de Bono married Josephine Hall-White. They had two sons, Caspar and Charlie, and later divorced. His will, published after his death, named two more children, another son, Francis Edward de Bono, also known as Edward de Bono, the son of Magdalena Szekely, and a daughter, Juliana Pars.

De Bono regularly visited Australia and in 1995 acquired Little Green Island, a private island of 24 hectares (59 acres) located off of Shoal Point, Queensland, from businesswoman Janet Holmes à Court. He subsequently constructed a retreat hosting corporate seminars and "think tank" events. De Bono owned four private islands in total, also including Reklusia Cay in the Bahamas, West Skeam Island in Ireland, and Tessera in Italy's Venetian Lagoon. In a 2003 interview he observed "I just like islands, that's all", and compared owning an island to having "your own principality, territory and psychological space".

De Bono was awarded honorary degrees from the Royal Melbourne Institute of Technology, and the University of Dundee. Asteroid 2541 Edebono discovered by Luboš Kohoutek is named after him. Three years after De Bono died, a middle school in Handaq named the school after him, using the legacy of lateral thinking.

== Published works ==
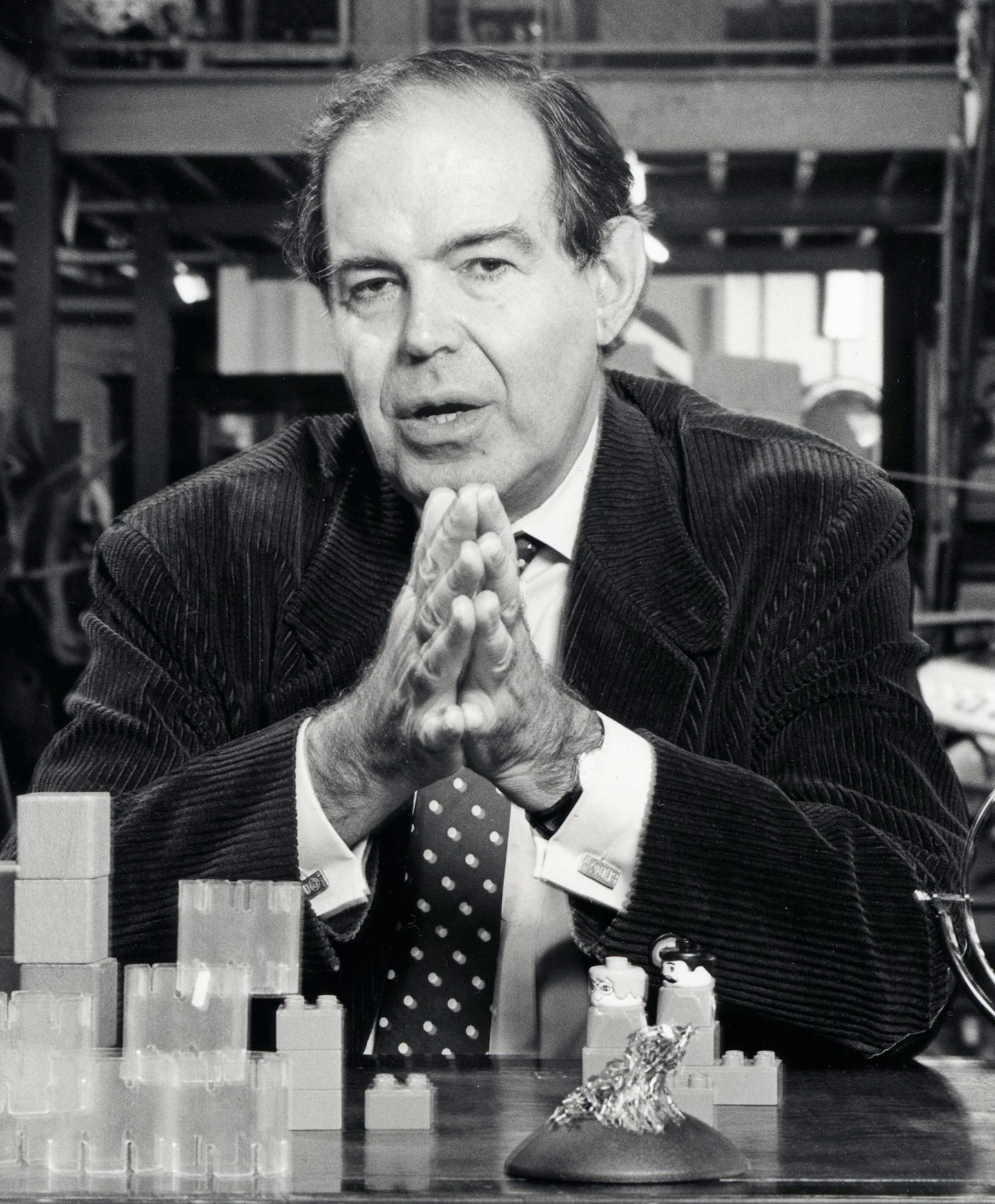
De Bono on Channel 4 lecture programme Opinions, produced by Open Media in 1994

A partial list of books by de Bono includes:

- The Use of Lateral Thinking (1967) ISBN 978-0-14-013788-0, introduced the term "lateral thinking"
- New Think (1967, 1968) ISBN 978-0-380-01426-2
- The Five-Day Course in Thinking (1968), introduced the L game
- The Mechanism of Mind (1969), Intl Center for Creative Thinking 1992 reprint: ISBN 978-0-14-013787-3
- Lateral Thinking: Creativity Step by Step, (1970), Harper & Row 1973 paperback: ISBN 978-0-06-090325-1
- The Dog-Exercising Machine (1970)
- Technology Today (1971)
- Practical Thinking (1971)
- Lateral Thinking for Management (1971)
- Po: A Device for Successful Thinking (1972), ISBN 978-0-671-21338-1, introduced the term Po
- Children Solve Problems (1972) ISBN 978-0-14-080323-5, ISBN 978-0-06-011024-6 (1974 reprint)
- Po: Beyond Yes and No (1973), ISBN 978-0-14-021715-5
- Eureka!: An Illustrated History of Inventions from the Wheel to the Computer (1974)
- Teaching Thinking (1976)
- The Greatest Thinkers: The Thirty Minds That Shaped Our Civilization (1976), ISBN 978-0-399-11762-6
- Wordpower: An Illustrated Dictionary of Vital Words (1977)
- The Happiness Purpose (1977)
- Opportunities: A handbook for business opportunity search (1978)
- Future Positive (1979)
- Atlas of Management Thinking (1981)
- De Bono's Thinking Course (1982)
- Learn-To-Think: Coursebook and Instructors Manual with Michael Hewitt-Gleeson de Saint-Arnaud (1982), ISBN 978-0-88496-199-4
- Tactics: The Art and Science of Success (1985)
- Conflicts: A Better Way to Resolve them (1985)
- Masterthinker's Handbook (1985)
- Six Thinking Hats (1985) ISBN 978-0-316-17831-0
- I Am Right, You Are Wrong: From This to the New Renaissance: From Rock Logic to Water Logic (1968) ISBN 978-0-670-84231-5
- Six Action Shoes (1991)
- Handbook for the Positive Revolution (1991) ISBN 978-0-14-012679-2
- Serious Creativity: Using the Power of Lateral Thinking to Create New Ideas (1992) ISBN 978-0-00-255143-4 – a summation of many of De Bono's ideas on creativity
- Sur/Petition (1992) ISBN 978-0-88730-543-6
- Water Logic: The Alternative to I am Right You are Wrong (1993) ISBN 978-1-56312-037-4
- Parallel thinking: from Socratic thinking to de Bono thinking (1994) ISBN 978-0-670-85126-3
- Teach Yourself How to Think (1995)
- Textbook of Wisdom (1996) ISBN 978-0-670-87011-0
- How to Be More Interesting (1998)
- Simplicity (1999)
- New Thinking for the New Millennium (1999)
- Why I Want To Be King of Australia (1999)
- The De Bono Code Book (2000) ISBN 978-0-14-028777-6
- How to Have A Beautiful Mind (2004)
- Six Value Medals (2005) ISBN 978-0-09-189459-7
- H+ (Plus): A New Religion (2006) ISBN 978-0-09-191047-1
- How to Have Creative Ideas (2007) ISBN 978-0-09-191048-8
- Free or Unfree? : Are Americans Really Free? (2007) ISBN 978-1-59777-544-1
- Intelligence, Information, Thinking (2007) ISBN 978-1-84-218133-1
- Six Frames For Thinking About Information (2008) ISBN 978-1-40-702316-8
- The Love of Two Cockroaches (2009) ISBN 978-9-99-326159-9
- Think! Before It's Too Late (2009) ISBN 978-0-09-192409-6
- Lateral Thinking – An Introduction (2014) ISBN 978-0-09-195502-1
- Bonting – Thinking to Create Value (2016) ISBN 978-9-99-575019-0

De Bono also wrote numerous articles published in refereed and other journals, including The Lancet and Clinical Science.

== See also ==
- Po (lateral thinking)

== Research on Edward de Bono's methods ==
1. Can Simple Ideation Techniques Enhance Idea Generation? Belski, I., Hourani, A., Valentine, A., & Belski, A. In A. Bainbridge-Smith, Z. T. Qi, & G.S. Gupta (Eds.), Proceedings of the 25th Annual Conference of the Australasian Association for Engineering Education (pp. 1–9). Wellington, New Zealand. 2014
2. Can simple ideation techniques influence idea generation: comparing results from Australia, Czech Republic, Finland and Russian Federation. Belski, I., Belski, A., Berdonosov, V., Busov, B., Bartlova, M. Malashevskaya, E., ...Tervonen, N. In A. Oo, A. Patel, T.Hilditch, & S. Chandran (Ed.s), Proceedings of the 26th Annual Conference of the Australasian Association for Engineering Education (pp. 474–873). Geelong, Australia: School of Engineering, Deakin University. 2015
3. Eight Fields of MATCEMIB help students to generate more ideas. Belski, I., Livotov, P., & Mayer, O. Procedia CIRP, 39, 85-90 2016
4. Engineering Creativity: The Influence of General Knowledge and Thinking Heuristics Belski, I., Skiadopoulos, A., Aranda-Mena, G., Cascini, G., Russo, D. Advances in Systematic Creativity pp 245–263 2019
5. ‘E’ posibile migliorare la creattivita’ e’ la riflessivita’ dei ragazzi’ (Can we improve thinking and creativity in school children?) Tidona, G. DIALOGO – mensile regionale di cultura, politica e attualita’, n. 7, anno XXVI, October 2001
6. Reflexivity and creativity at school, Tidona, G. 2002
7. "The effects of the six thinking hats and speed on creativity in brainstorming". Göçmen, O., Coşkun H., 2019
8. The effects of the CoRT 1 thinking skills program on students. Edwards, J., & Baldauf, R. B. (Jr.). The effects of the CoRT 1 thinking skills programme on students. In D. N. Perkins, J. Lochhead, & J. Bishop (Eds.),Thinking: The second international conference (pp. 453–473). Hillsdale, NJ: Lawrence Erlbaum. 1987
9. Measuring the effects of the direct teaching of thinking skills. Edwards, J. Human Intelligence Newsletter, 9 (30), pp. 9–10;1988
10. The direct teaching of thinking skills Edwards, J. G. Evans, Learning and Teaching Cognitive Skills, Melbourne, Australian Council for Educational Research, 1991, pp. 87–106; 1991
11. Research work on the CoRT method. Edwards, J. In S. Maclure & P. Davies (Eds.), Learning to think: Thinking to learn (pp. 19–30). Oxford, UK: Pergamon. 1991
12. The Teaching of Thinking Edwards, J. Paper presented at the Joint AARE/NZARE Conference, Geelong. 1992
13. Thinking, education and human potential: International Interdisciplinary Perspectives. Melbourne: Hawker Brownlow, 6-15. 1994
14. Thinking and change. Edwards, J. In S. Dingli (Ed.), Creative thinking: A multi-faceted approach (pp. 16–29). Msida: Malta University Press. 1994
15. Teaching thinking in schools: An overview. Edwards, J. Teaching thinking in schools, Unicorn, 21(1), 27-36. 1995
16. The direct teaching of thinking in education and in business. Edwards, J. In S. Dingli (Ed.), Creative thinking: New perspectives (pp. 82–95). Msida: Malta University Press. 1996
17. Learning, Thinking and Assessment Edwards, J. Personal paper summarising work 1999
