= Swahili grammar =

Swahili is a Bantu language which is native to or mainly spoken in the East African region. It has a grammatical structure that is typical of Bantu languages, bearing all the hallmarks of this language family. These include agglutination, a rich array of noun classes, extensive inflection for person (both subject and object), tense, aspect and mood, and generally a subject–verb–object (SVO) word order.

== Typology ==
Swahili may be described in several ways depending on the aspect being considered.

- It is an agglutinative language. It constructs whole words by joining discrete roots and morphemes with specific meanings, and may also modify words by similar processes.
- Its basic word order is SVO. However, because the verb is inflected to indicate the subject and sometimes also the object, this order may be changed to emphasise certain parts of the sentence.
- It does not mark nouns for case. Nominal roles are indicated by a combination of word order and agreement markers on the verb, with no change to the nouns themselves.
- It has a complex grammatical gender system, but as this does not include a distinction based on natural sex, the term "noun class" is generally used instead of "gender".
- It has head-first order with few exceptions.
- It is a pro-drop language. Verbs may be used without explicitly specifying the subject or the object with substantives (nouns or pronouns).

== Nouns ==
=== Noun classes ===
Swahili nouns are grouped into noun classes based on the prefix they have, with each class having a prescribed number. For example, the nouns wasichana "girls" and wasimamizi "overseers" belong to class 2, characterised by the prefix wa-, whereas kifuniko "lid, cover" and kisukari "diabetes" belong to class 7, characterised by the prefix ki-. The classes 5, 9 and 10 are frequently without any prefix, such as gari a class-6 noun meaning "car" and chupa, meaning "bottle" in class 9 and "bottles" in class 10. The numbers are based on the classes reconstructed for Proto-Bantu, and have corresponding classes in the other Bantu languages which can be identified by the same system of numbers. Therefore, classes that are missing in Swahili create a gap in the numbering, as is the case with classes above 18 as well as classes 12 and 13, which are absent in standard Swahili (although do frequently occur in non-standard varieties). Tables in this article are labelled not only with the traditional numbering system for Bantu languages but also a simple label based on noun morphology in order to make the tables more accessible to learners, who are generally taught labels for classes such as "ki/vi" instead of "7/8".

When discussing Swahili noun classes, it is important to distinguish between (1) morphological noun classes as a quality of the noun themselves indicated by morphological features (generally prefixes), and (2) syntactic noun classes as an agreement (i.e. concord) paradigm affecting the use of other words in the sentence. Here, "noun class" is used with the former meaning. Morphological and syntactic noun classes often diverge, especially when it comes to nouns referring to people and animals which do not belong to the morphological noun class 1/2, signalled by m-wa. For more information, see concord.

The following noun classes exist:

Class		Prefix before...		Example	Typical meaning
Class		consonant	vowel	Example	Typical meaning
1	m-	m- (Note: This m- before a consonant is always syllabic /m̩/, even when the following consonant is b or v, as in mvulana "boy" [m̩.vu.ˈlɑ(ː).nɑ]. The mw- before a vowel, however, is not syllabic, as in mwalimu "teacher" [mwɑ.ˈli(ː).mu]. When the stem is only one syllable, the prefix takes the stress, as in mtu "person" [ˈm̩.tu]. Before a stem beginning with u, the prefix may appear as either mw- or mu-, as in mwuguzi / muuguzi "nurse". A few nouns, mostly loans, have mu- before a consonant, such as muziki "music", musuli "muscle" and muda "length of time" (although mziki, msuli and mda are also widespread variations). In class 3, the w is frequently absent before o as in moyo "heart" (plural: mioyo), moto "fire" (plural: mioto) and moshi "smoke".)	mw-	mtu "person"	Humans, animate / Singular
2	wa-	wa-	w(a)- (Note: Wa- is often present only as w- when the stem begins with /a/ as in wanafunzi "students" (singular: mwanafunzi). A following i may merge with the a of this prefix, forming we- as in wezi "thieves" (singular: mwizi). The a in this prefix is generally preserved in nouns which are derived from verbs, such as waandishi "writer" (singular: mwandishi, from the verb ‑andika "to write"), as well as those derived from proper nouns, such as Waafrika "Africans" (singular: Mwafrika) and Waislamu "Muslims" (singular: Mwislamu).)	watu "people"	Humans, animate / Plural
3	m-	m-	mw-	mti "tree"	Plants, inanimate / Singular
4	mi-	mi-	my-	miti "trees"	Plants, inanimate / Plural
5	ji-	(ji-) (Note: The ji- prefix occurs on nouns with monosyllabic stems, such as jiwe "stone" (plural: mawe), but is absent from longer words. This is not to be confused with the augmentative prefix ji-, which is not dropped in the plural, for example jiji "large town, city" (plural: majiji, from mji "town"). Some nouns may also simply have stems which start with ji- such as jina "name" (plural: majina). Some words whose stems begin with a vowel take the prefix j-, such as jambo "thing, affair" (plural: mambo) but others do not, such as azimio "resolution" (plural: maazimio).)	(j-)	jicho "eye"	Various / Singular
6	ma-	ma-	ma- (Note: The prefix ma- may merge with a following i to become me- as in meno "teeth" (singular: jino).)	macho "eyes"	Various / Plural
7	ki-	ki-	ch-/ki- (Note: The prefixes ki- and vi- may sometimes appear before vowels, such as in kiazi "potato" (plural: viazi) rather than the possibly expected *chazi and *vyazi. It is possible to regard the stem of these words as beginning with the i (e.g. ‑iazi) as adjectives beginning with i, such as ‑ingine "other" simply take k- and v- prefixes in these classes.)	kitabu "book"	Various, diminutives, manner/way/language / Singular
8	vi-	vi-	vy-/vi-	vitabu "books"	Various, diminutives, manner/way/language / Plural
9	N-	n- (Note: The n of the prefix is a prenasalising mutation of the following consonant and is never syllabic unless the noun would otherwise only have one syllable. It becomes m before b and v. In stems beginning with w such as ‑wili "two", this mutates to mb. Before vowels it is present as ny. Before d, z, j and g it is n. L and r become nd. Before other consonants, it disappears unless it is required as a syllabic consonant to prevent the noun from having only one syllable, such as in nchi "country, land". The plural form of class 11 nouns is formed this way, dropping the u- and then applying these rules (for example ulimi → ndimi "tongue" → "tongues", ukuta → kuta "wall" → "walls"), except that short nouns with a monosyllabic stem preserve the u- in the plural for reasons of stress, adding ny- before it to form the plural, such as uso "face", which becomes nyuso in the plural.)	ny-	simba "lion"	Animals, inanimate / Singular
10	N-	n-	ny-	simba "lions", funguo "keys"	Animals, inanimate / Plural
11	u-	u-	u-/uw-/w- (Note: The u- prefix has some variation in spelling and pronunciation before vowels.)	ufunguo "key"	Things with an extended outline shape
14	u-	u-	u-/uw-/w-	utu "humanity"	Abstract nouns
15	ku-	ku-	ku-/kw- (Note: The ku- prefix becomes kw- only before a minority of stems: kwenda "to go" and kwisha "to finish".)	kula "eating, consuming"	Infinitives
16	-ni/pa-	(Note: The locative classes of nouns no longer have their original pa-, ku-, m(u)-prefixes in Swahili, with these only appearing on adjectives, demonstratives and other parts of the grammar. Most nouns form their locative form by adding the suffix -ni although this cannot be added to geographical place names, many recent loans and certain other words.)	-	mahali "place"	Locatives (proximal, exact)
17	-ni/ku-	-	-	mahali "place"	Locatives (distal, approximate)
18	-ni/m-	-	-	mahali "place"	Locatives (interior)

Every class up to 11 can be regarded as inherently singular or plural. Odd-numbered classes are singular, even-numbered classes are plural. The plural of a noun is normally formed by switching it to the next higher class. Thus, the plural of class 1 mtu "person" is class 2 watu "people". For class 11 nouns, the plural is in class 10. Class 14 usually has no plural at all, but in rare instances class 6 is used to form a plural for these nouns, for example ugonjwa "sickness, disease", magonjwa "diseases". Class 6 also contains a lot of nouns for liquids, such as maji "water", and other nouns derived from verbs such as mazungumzo "conversation(s)". Aside from these, there are some nouns in other classes that do not change class to indicate number, such as mchana "afternoon(s)", "daytime" (class 3), vita "war(s)" (class 8), usiku "night(s)" (class 14), and these can be shown as singular or plural only by surrounding context.

In terms of meaning, groups of similar nouns tend to belong to similar noun classes. For example, nouns for people, including agent nouns, are commonly in classes 1/2, while animals are often in classes 9/10. Nouns describing plants are in class 3/4 and any fruit they produce will probably be in class 5/6. Abstract nouns are often in class 14, loanwords in classes 9/10 and 5/6. Many nouns for liquids are in class 6. Infinitives/gerunds of verbs are in class 15. Diminutives as well as the words for many man-made tools and languages are in class 7/8. These are only generalisations and there are exceptions in most classes.

=== Concord ===
The class of the noun determines the forms of other parts of speech that relate to it, such as verbs, adjectives, etc. This process is called agreement or concord. These other parts of speech receive their own concordant prefixes (termed "concords" for short), generally matching in class with the noun, though the prefixes themselves are not always the same. In the examples below, the left and right sides of the table show sentences with a singular and then plural subject respectively.

Class 1/2:
mwanaume m-kubwa a-li-anguk(a) (CL1)man CL1-big CL1-PST-fall man big s/he-fell "The big man fell."	↔	wanaume wa-kubwa wa-li-anguk(a) (CL2)men CL2-big CL2-PST-fall men big they-fell "The big men fell."

Class 7/8:
kitabu ki-kubwa ki-li-anguk(a) (CL7)book CL7-big CL7-PST-fall book big it-fell "The big book fell."	↔	vitabu vi-kubwa vi-li-anguk(a) (CL8)books CL8-big CL8-PST-fall books big they-fell "The big books fell."

Class 11/10:
uso m-zuri u-na-tosh(a) (CL11)face CL11-beautiful CL11-PRES-be.enough face beautiful it-is-enough "A beautiful face is enough."	↔	nyuso n-zuri zi-na-tosh(a) (CL10)faces CL10-beautiful CL10-PRES-be.enough faces beautiful they-are-enough "Beautiful faces are enough."

Animate nouns (i.e. those referring to people or animals) which are not in classes 1/2 generally take the agreement prefixes (concords) from classes 1/2 as if they did belong to it.

Class 7/8 Animate:
kifaru m-kubwa a-li-anguk(a) (CL7)rhinoceros CL1-big CL1-PST-fall rhinoceros big s/he-fell "The big rhinoceros fell."	↔	vifaru wa-kubwa wa-li-anguk(a) (CL8)rhinoceroses CL2-big CL2-PST-fall rhinoceroses big they-fell "The big rhinoceroses fell."

Animacy agreements can often distinguish different meanings of the same noun, such as ndege, which means "bird(s)" when animate and "aeroplane(s)" when inanimate.

Class 9/10 Animate:
ndege m-kubwa a-li-anguk(a) (CL9)bird CL1-big CL1-PST-fall bird big s/he-fell "The big bird fell."	↔	ndege wa-kubwa wa-li-anguk(a) (CL10)birds CL2-big CL2-PST-fall birds big they-fell "The big birds fell."

Class 9/10 Inanimate:
ndege N-kubwa i-li-anguk(a) (CL9)bird CL9-big CL9-PST-fall bird big it-fell "The big plane fell."	↔	ndege N-kubwa zi-li-anguk(a) (CL10)birds CL10-big CL10-PST-fall birds big they-fell "The big planes fell."

Animate nouns in classes 9/10 may exhibit a slight aberration from this pattern. The genitive pronominal forms -angu, -ako, -ake, -etu, -enu and -ao are frequently inflected with a group of nouns referring to close human relationships with their appropriate class 9/10 concords, regardless of the fact that they are animate (giving yangu, yako, yetu etc. in singular and zangu, zako, zetu etc. in plural). For some speakers, the same rule applies to the simple genitive preposition -a (giving ya in singular and za in plural), however for most speakers wa is used for all animate nouns regardless of number or class. Other parts of speech are unaffected by this exception.

Class 9/10 Animate:
mama y-etu m-kubwa a-li-anguk(a) (CL9)mother CL9-GEN.1P CL1-big CL1-PST-fall mother our big s/he-fell "Our (older maternal) aunt fell."	↔	mama z-etu wa-kubwa wa-li-anguk(a) (CL10)mothers CL10-GEN.1P CL2-big CL2-PST-fall mothers our big they-fell "Our (older maternal) aunts fell."
Note: The phrase mama mkubwa, literally "big mother", refers to the elder sister of one's mother.

Class 9/10 Animate:
baba y-angu w-a kambo a-li-anguk(a) (CL9)father CL9-GEN.1S CL1-GEN non.blood.relationship CL1-PST-fall father my of {non-blood relationship} {s/he fell} "My stepfather fell."	↔	baba z-angu w-a kambo wa-li-anguk(a) (CL10)fathers CL10-GEN.1S CL2-GEN non.blood.relationship CL2-PST-fall fathers my of {non-blood relationship} {they fell} "My stepfathers fell."

Nouns which follow this pattern of agreement include mama "mother(s)", baba "father(s)", ndugu "sibling(s)/relative(s)", kaka "(elder) brother(s)", dada "(elder) sister(s)", nyanya "grandmother(s)", bibi "grandmother(s)", babu "grandfather(s)", shangazi "paternal aunt(s)", shemeji "sister(s)/brother(s)-in-law", wifi "sister(s)-in-law", jamaa "relative(s)", rafiki "friend(s)", shoga "female friend of a woman", jirani "neighbour" and adui "enemy".

Nouns of this group, such as rafiki "friend", may optionally take a plural prefix ma- as though belonging to class 5/6, although their concords remain the same mix of class 1/2 and 9/10.

Class 9/10 Animate:
rafiki y-angu a-na-ishi hapa (CL9)friend CL9-GEN.1S CL1-PRES-live here friend my s/he-lives here "My friend lives here."	↔	(ma)-rafiki z-angu wa-na-ishi hapa (PL.CL6)-(CL10)friend CL10-GEN.1S CL2-PRES-live here friends my they-live here "My friends live here."

In addition, animals of classes 9/10 generally take class 1 agreement throughout the singular, but may take 10 agreement on pronominal genitive words in the plural.

Class 9/10 Animate:
ng'ombe w-etu a-me-ku-f(a) (CL9)cow CL1-GEN.1P CL1-PRF-EXT-die cow our s/he-has-died	↔	ng'ombe z-etu wa-me-ku-f(a) (CL10)cows CL10-GEN.1P CL2-PRF-EXT-die "Our cows are dead."

Class 9/10 Animate:
rafiki y-angu a-na-ishi hapa (CL9)friend CL9-GEN.1S CL1-PRES-live here friend my s/he-lives here "My friend lives here."	↔	(ma)-rafiki z-angu wa-na-ishi hapa (PL.CL6)-(CL10)friend CL10-GEN.1S CL2-PRES-live here friends my they-live here "My friends live here."

Another departure from the rule of animate nouns taking concords in classes 1/2 occurs on occasion with diminutives and augmentatives, whereby using concords of the class the noun belongs to (5/6 for augmentatives, 7/8 for diminutives) emphasises the diminution or augmentation.

Class 1 (neutral):		Class 7 (diminutive):
mpenzi w-ake a-na-ishi hapa (CL1)lover CL1-GEN.3S CL1-PRES-live here "His/her boyfriend/girlfriend/lover lives here."	↔	kipenzi ch-ake ki-na-ishi hapa (CL7)lover CL7-GEN.3S CL7-PRES-live here "His/her sweetheart/darling lives here."

=== Locative classes ===
A locative noun is a derived noun that indicates a location associated with the base noun from which it is derived. The change in meaning can translate to a variety of English prepositions indicating location, such as "in", "at", "on", "to" or "from", and is thus quite general in meaning, with the exact meaning of the phrase generally being determined by the verb.

The Arabic loan noun mahali "place" (and its variations: pahali, mahala and pahala) is the only noun which inherently belongs to the locative class. Other nouns can be made locative by adding the suffix -ni to the end, although this is not available for proper nouns referring to places, any animate nouns, recent loanwords and some other arbitrary nouns.

Because locative nouns constitute three classes of their own, they cannot take the usual concords of the noun they have been derived from. The concords themselves show in which one of the locative classes the noun is being used. Class 16 is marked by concords based on pa- and indicates specific location. Class 17, with concords based on ku- indicates a more general location. Class 18 has concords based on mu- and indicates internal location.

- nyumba ya Rehema "Rehema's house" (class 9)
- nyumbani kwa Rehema "at/to/from Rehema's house" (class 17)
- chumba cha Daudi "Daudi's room" (class 7)
- chumbani mwa Daudi "in/into/out of Daudi's room" (class 18)

=== Apposition and compounding ===
The equivalent of compound words is usually formed using the genitive construction such as mpira wa kikapu "basketball" (literally "ball of basket"). This is similar to the compounding process found in many languages such as French fin de semaine "weekend" (literally "end of week").

There are also many compounds which do not use the genitive preposition -a. In these cases, two (or more) nouns are simply placed side by side. This is the case of skilled workpersons such as fundi viatu (shoemaker), fundi baskeli (bicycle mechanics) and so on.

The word order is the reverse of most compounds in English, with the head always preceding the modifiers in Swahili; in other words, the first noun describes what it is, and any subsequent noun narrows or specifies that description. For example, the class 9/10 noun punda "donkey(s)" is followed by the class 4 noun milia "stripes" to mean "zebra". Whereas in English, a hypothetical equivalent compound would place the noun for the stripes first and also require the singular: "stripe-donkey", the word for "donkey" appears first in Swahili.

There is a good deal of variation among different authors as to whether the nouns are written together, hyphenated or separated and thus the word for "zebra(s)" may appear as any of pundamilia, punda-milia or punda milia.

A few common compound words have irregular plural forms because number marking occurs on both elements. The word mwanamke "woman" becomes wanawake "women" in plural. Similarly, mwanamume "man" becomes wanaume "men" in plural, although the singular form mwanaume is also common. These two nouns are formed from the word mwana "son, daughter", which is commonly used in compounds to essentially mean "person", followed by the words mke "wife" (plural: wake) and mume "husband" (plural: waume) respectively.

== Pronouns ==
Pronouns behave in many ways like nouns, having both plural and singular forms, being present in the full range of noun classes but no inflection for case, meaning that, for instance, there is no difference between we and us, which are both sisi.

=== Personal pronouns ===
Personal pronouns occur in two forms: an independent form, which is used as a word alone, and a combining stem, which is used when combined with words such as na "with, and" and ndi- "it is". The independent form consists, in all cases except for wao, of a reduplication of a syllable. Nyinyi, however, may alternatively be dissimilated to ninyi. These pronouns also have a separate genitive (possessive) stem, which is the combining stem that is used when a genitive prefix is added.

Class	Independent	Combining suffix	Genitive suffix	"all"
1S	mimi	-mi	-angu	—N/a
2S	wewe	-we	-ako	—N/a
3S	yeye	-ye	-ake	—N/a
1PL	sisi	-si	-etu	(sisi) sote
2PL	nyinyi, ninyi	-nyi	-enu	(nyinyi) nyote
3PL	wao	-o	-ao	(wao) wote

Note that the sex/gender of referents is not distinguished, with yeye capable of meaning either "he" or "she". These pronouns are, however, restricted to use with animate referents, i.e. people or animals, so it does not generally mean it. The genitive form -ake has no such restriction and may mean "his", "hers" or "its" depending on context. The genitive -ake is also used instead of -ao to mean "their" when the referent is inanimate. When the referent is animate, as is most typical, -ao is used.

The genitive (or possessive) forms are given prefixes corresponding to the class of the possessed noun which precedes it as shown in the table in the section on the genitive -a, for example kitabu changu "my book", vitabu vyangu "my books", jina lako "your name", majina yao "their names".

Swahili is a pro-drop language. As the verb usually already includes prefixes to indicate the subject and object, personal pronouns are not strictly needed, and are mostly used for emphasis. The exceptions to this include cases when the copula ni (or its negative counterpart si) is used, as well as with the habitual form of the verb, which lacks subject prefixes.

In informal speech, when pronouns are unstressed, they may appear in a reduced form, such as mi or mie for mimi, we or wee for wewe etc. This mainly occurs when the pronoun is not added only for emphasis, but is needed (e.g. mi ni "I am", informally), and this also frequently occurs where the first person singular subject prefix ni- is dropped in casual speech before -na-. For example, standard (mimi) ninajua "I know" often occurs as (mi) najua in spoken Swahili.

=== Reference and relative pronouns ===
Each noun class has a corresponding reference pronoun (or combining pronoun) which is a single syllable that never stands alone but may be suffixed on certain other words such as na and ndi- where it can be thought of as meaning "it" (singular classes), "they", "them" (plural classes) or "here", "there" etc. for the locative classes. For all noun classes other than class 1, the reference pronoun is formed by suffixing -o to the verbal concord with sound changes such as the disappearance of u and a, the transformation of i to y when alone or preceded by v, the palatalisation of ki to ch etc.

The reference pronouns are added to specific slots in relative verb forms and thus may be glossed as either REL "relative" or REF "reference". The independent relative pronouns, equivalent to English relative pronouns (that, which, who(m)) and relative adverbs (where, when, how) are formed by attaching the reference pronouns to amba-.

Class		Reference / Combining Pronoun	Relative Pronoun
1	m-	-ye	ambaye
2	wa-	-o	ambao
3	m-	-o	ambao
4	mi-	-yo	ambayo
5	ji-	-lo	ambalo
6	ma-	-yo	ambayo
7	ki-	-cho	ambacho
8	vi-	-vyo	ambavyo
9	N-	-yo	ambayo
10	N-	-zo	ambazo
11	u-	-o	ambao
14	u-	-o	ambao
15	ku-	-ko	ambako
16	-ni/pa-	-po	ambapo
17	-ni/ku-	-ko	ambako
18	-ni/m-	-mo	ambamo

== Determiners ==
Determiners in Swahili are capable of being used adjectivally (with a noun) or pronominally (standing in for an absent noun). The inflection of Swahili determiners resembles that of verbs.

=== Articles ===
There are no articles in Swahili. A word such as kitabu "book" may be taken to mean either "the book" or "a book" depending on context.

If a distinction must be made, demonstratives or adjectives may be used to provide various shades of meaning such as kitabu hicho "that (aforementioned) book", kitabu kimoja "one book", kitabu fulani "some (particular) book", kitabu chochote "any book (at all)".

A verbal object prefix may also be used in conjunction with a nominal object and this is more frequent when a definite reading is preferred.

- Nitaleta kikombe kesho. "I will bring a cup tomorrow."
- Nitakileta kikombe kesho "I will bring the cup tomorrow."

An effect similar to a definite article may be achieved by the use of a medial demonstrative (before or after the noun) or a distal demonstrative (placed before the noun or before any following adjectives). These are not quite equivalent to demonstrative articles in languages where article use is obligatory as these demonstratives merely serve to highlight that the referent has already been mentioned and are thus a little more emphatic than a true definite article.

- Nita(ki)leta hicho kikombe kesho. "I will bring the/that (aforementioned) cup tomorrow."
- Nita(ki)leta kikombe hicho kesho. "I will bring the/that (aforementioned) cup tomorrow."
- Nita(ki)leta kile kikombe kesho "I will bring the/that (aforementioned) cup tomorrow."

=== Demonstratives ===
The demonstratives in Swahili may be used either as adjectives, with a noun, or as pronouns, standing alone. They occur in three types:

- Proximal ("this, these"), referring to something near the speaker. It is formed by prefixing the verbal concord with hV- where "V" stands for a vowel identical to the vowel of the next syllable.
- Distal ("that, those"), referring to something far from both speaker and listener. It is formed by suffixing -le to the verbal concord.
- Medial/Referential ("the aforementioned"), referring to something that has been previously mentioned. It may also occasionally be used to refer to something nearer to the listener than the speaker. It is formed by replacing the final syllable of the proximal demonstrative with the appropriate reference pronoun for the noun class.

Class		Proximal	Distal	Medial / Referential
1	m-	huyu	yule	huyo
2	wa-	hawa	wale	hao
3	m-	huu	ule	huo
4	mi-	hii	ile	hiyo
5	ji-	hili	lile	hilo
6	ma-	haya	yale	hayo
7	ki-	hiki	kile	hicho
8	vi-	hivi	vile	hivyo
9	N-	hii	ile	hiyo
10	N-	hizi	zile	hizo
11	u-	huu	ule	huo
14	u-	huu	ule	huo
15	ku-	huku	kule	huko
16	-ni/pa-	hapa	pale	hapo
17	-ni/ku-	huku	kule	huko
18	-ni/m-	humu	mle	humo

The demonstratives may stand alone, as pronouns, but may also be used adjectivally in combination with a noun, much like "this" and "that" in English. The demonstrative generally follows the noun but it can also precede it for emphasis. Before a noun, it often takes on a slightly more article-like role, as explained above.

=== Other determiners ===
The words -ote "all", -o-ote "any", -pi "which" and -enyewe "-self", "-selves", appear with prefixes following the verbal inflection pattern. In older texts, -o-ote was frequently written as two words (e.g. yo yote, vyo vyote) however it is now more frequently written together. For the sake of comparison, the following table also includes the genitive and ornative prepositions -a and -enye as well as the verbal subject prefixes for each class. Note that class 1 has the most irregularity and diversity of form.

Class	Determiners				Prepositions		Verbal Prefix
Class	-ote "all"	-o-ote "any"	-pi "which"	-enyewe "self", "selves"	-a "of"	-enye "having"	Subject
1	—N/a	yeyote	yupi	mwenyewe	wa	mwenye	a- / yu-
2	wote (Note: The 1st and 2nd person plural have their own forms for "all", namely sote and nyote. These may be used with or without the pronoun: sisi sote or simply sote can mean "all of us", "we all". When used with the form wote, the meaning is "both": sisi wote "both of us", "we both".)	wowote	wepi (Note: The irregular form wepi is used to avoid clashes with the word wapi meaning "where".) ( / wapi)	wenyewe	wa	wenye	wa-
3	wote	wowote	upi	wenyewe	wa	wenye	u-
4	yote	yoyote	ipi	yenyewe	ya	yenye	i-
5	lote	lolote	lipi	lenyewe	la	lenye	li-
6	yote	yoyote	yapi	yenyewe	ya	yenye	ya-
7	chote	chochote	kipi	chenyewe	cha	chenye	ki-
8	vyote	vyovyote	vipi (Note: The word vipi may be used to ask "which" of class 8 nouns (e.g. vitabu vipi? "which books?"), but, as is typical for class 8, can also be understood adverbially, following a verb to mean "how?".)	vyenyewe	vya	vyenye	vi-
9	yote	yoyote	ipi	yenyewe	ya	yenye	i-
10	zote	zozote	zipi	zenyewe	za	zenye	zi-
11	wote	wowote	upi	wenyewe	wa	wenye	u-
14	wote	wowote	upi	wenyewe	wa	wenye	u-
15	kote / kwote	kokote / kwokwote	kupi	kwenyewe	kwa	kwenye	ku-
16	pote	popote	wapi (Note: The usual word for "where" or "which place" is wapi, however some sources list a regular form papi.) ( / papi)	penyewe	pa	penye	pa-
17	kote / kwote	kokote / kwokwote	kupi	kwenyewe	kwa	kwenye	ku-
18	mote / mwote	momote / mwomwote	mpi	mwenyewe	mwa	mwenye	m(u)-

== Adjectives ==
The term "adjective", as applied to Swahili and most other Bantu languages, usually applies only to a rather restricted set of words. However, in the wider sense, it can refer to any word that modifies a noun. The wider sense is used here. Adjectives in the stricter Bantu sense are referred to as "true adjectives" in this article. True adjectives in Swahili may be divided into two categories: inflecting adjectives, which take a prefix indicating the noun class of their referent, and invariable adjectives, which do not take a prefix.

All adjectives follow the noun they modify; aside from the plain adjectives, they also require some kind of prefix whose class matches the preceding noun. The different types of adjectives reflect the different prefixes that are used:

- Inflecting adjectives are true adjectives which are prefixed with an adjective concord.
- Plain adjectives are true adjectives which do not take concord prefixes.
- Relatives are relativised verbs which can be used as adjectives.
- Genitives are phrases consisting of a noun introduced by the genitive preposition -a.
- Ornatives are phrases consisting of a noun introduced by the ornative preposition -enye.

=== Inflecting adjectives ===
Inflecting adjectives are words which describe a noun or pronoun and take the following prefixes, which are very similar to the prefixes found on nouns. This distinguishes them from determiners, which take prefixes similar to those on verbs. The most notable departure from the nominal inflection pattern among inflecting adjectives is the replacement of the nominal u- prefix in class 11 (and generally also 14) with the adjectival m- prefix. The locative classes also carry prefixes, unlike the locative nouns they refer to.

Most inflecting adjectives have stems beginning with a consonant. Of those that begin with a vowel, almost all of these have stems that begin with either e (for example, -ekundu "red") or i (e.g. -ingi "many, much"). A very small minority of adjectives begin with other vowels, but these happen to refer only to animate referents and thus only have forms in classes 1 and 2, for example: -ovu "evil, wicked", which is mwovu in class 1 and waovu in class 2.

	Nominally prefixed		
Class	Before Consonant	Replacing i	Replacing e
1	m-	mwi-	mwe-
2	wa-	we-	we-
3	m-	mwi-	mwe-
4	mi-	mi-	mye-
5	(ji-) (Note: The ji- prefix only occurs on the adjective -pya "new" in order to make sure it has more than one syllable so that the antepenult can be stressed.)	ji-	je-
6	ma-	me-	me-
7	ki-	ki-	che-
8	vi-	vi-	vye-
9	N- (Note: The N- prefix in classes 9 and 10 exhibits considerable variation. On adjectives with stems of more than one syllable, it only appears as a prenasalisation of the following consonants: b → mb, d → nd, g → ng, j → nj, l → nd, r → nd, v → mv, w → mb, z → nz. Elsewhere, it disappears. In addition, the monosyllabic adjective stem -pya "new" has the form mpya, whereby the m- constitutes the stressed syllable.)	nyi-	nye- (Note: The adjective -ema "good, kind, nice" has the irregular form njema in class 9 and 10 instead of the expected form *nyema.)
10	N-	nyi-	nye-
11	m-	mwi-	mwe-
14	m-/u- (Note: In modern standard Swahili, adjectives in class 14 take the prefix m(w)-, however, in an earlier stage of the language, they took the prefix u-/w- which is still preserved in some idiomatic phrases but has otherwise disappeared, marking the almost complete merge of classes 11 and 14.)	mwi-/wi-	mwe-/we-
15	ku-	kwi-	kwe-
16	pa-	pe-	pe-
17	ku-	kwi-	kwe-
18	mu-	mwi-	mwe-

The adjective -ingine "other", is sometimes given inflections prefixes of the type found with determiners, following a verbal rather than a nominal pattern. Most notably, the forms lingine in class 5, ingine or yingine in class 9 and zingine in class 10 may be heard. Some speakers also use an e in these classes: jengine, lengine, nyengine, yengine and zengine sometimes occurring. These forms are regarded as non-standard, although they may be commonly heard. The standard forms of each are jingine for class 5 and nyingine for classes 9 and 10.

The numerals -moja "one", -wili "two", -tatu "three", -nne "four", -tano "five" and -nane "eight", as well as all numbers that end with these words, take prefixes as inflecting adjectives do.

- mtu mmoja "one person", watu wawili "two people", watu ishirini na mmoja "twenty-one people", watu ishirini na wawili "twenty-two people"
- kitabu kimoja "one book", vitabu viwili "two books", vitabu ishirini na kimoja "twenty-one books", vitabu ishirini na viwili "twenty-two books"
- nyumba moja "one house", nyumba mbili "two houses", nyumba ishirini na moja "twenty-one houses", nyumba ishirini na mbili "twenty-two houses"

=== Invariable adjectives ===
Invariable adjectives are mostly loanwords from Arabic, such as safi "clean", ghali "expensive", although loanwords from other languages are also present, such as faini, from English "fine". Nouns placed as modifiers after other nouns may also be regarded as invariable adjectives, such as msichana kiziwi "Deaf girl", which has a class 1 prefix m- and a class 7 prefix ki-. Numbers loaned from Arabic: sita "six", saba "seven" and tisa "nine", ishirini "twenty", etc., as well as the native Bantu number kumi "ten", function as invariable adjectives. The interrogative adjective gani "what kind of" or, colloquially, "which" is also invariable.

- watu tisa "nine people"
- vitabu tisa "nine books"
- nyumba tisa "nine houses"

=== Relatives ===
Relatives are verbs used as adjectives by being relativised using a relative prefix (or suffix) which agrees with the noun's class. In the following table, all forms given have a subject prefix and a relative affix that correspond to the same noun class as this is always the case when verbs are used in this simple adjectival manner. More complex relative clauses, which will not be further discussed in this section, frequently involve different noun classes.

Person / Class	Present Positive	Past Positive	Future Positive	Tenseless	
Person / Class	Present Positive	Past Positive	Future Positive	Negative	Positive
1st sing.	ninaye-	niliye-	nitakaye-	nisiye-	ni-...-ye
2nd sing.	unaye-	uliye-	utakaye-	usiye-	u-...-ye
1st plur.	tunao-	tulio-	tutakao-	tusio-	tu-...-o
2nd plur.	mnao-	mlio-	mtakao-	msio-	m(w)-...o
1	anaye-	aliye-	atakaye-	asiye-	a-...-ye
2	wanao-	walio-	watakao-	wasio-	wa-...-o
3	unao-	ulio-	utakao-	usio-	u-...-o
4	inayo-	iliyo-	itakayo-	isiyo-	i-...-yo
5	linalo-	lililo-	litakalo-	lisilo-	li-...-lo
6	yanayo-	yaliyo-	yatakayo-	yasiyo-	ya-...-yo
7	kinacho-	kilicho-	kitakacho-	kisicho-	ki-...-cho
8	vinavyo-	vilivyo-	vitakavyo-	visivyo-	vi-...-vyo
9	inayo-	iliyo-	itakayo-	isiyo-	i-...-yo
10	zinazo-	zilizo-	zitakazo-	zisizo-	zi-...-zo
11	unao-	ulio-	utakao-	usio-	u-...-o
14	unao-	ulio-	utakao-	usio-	u-...-o
15	kunako-	kuliko-	kutakako-	kusiko-	ku-...-ko
16	panapo-	palipo-	patakapo-	pasipo-	pa-...-po
17	kunako-	kuliko-	kutakako-	kusiko-	ku-...-ko
18	mnamo-	mlimo-	mtakamo-	msimo-	m(w)-...-mo

These are frequently used in Swahili and make up for the relative paucity of true adjectives. For example, there are no true adjectives equivalent to the English adjective "open". The verb kufunguliwa "to be opened", when relativised, conveys this meaning. Examples of this in use:

- mlango uliofunguliwa "open door" (door which was opened)
- milango iliyofunguliwa "open doors" (doors which were opened)
- dirisha lililofunguliwa "open window" (window which was opened)
- madirisha yaliyofunguliwa "open windows" (windows which were opened)

Similarly, although the adjective -fu "dead", "deceased" exists, it is comparatively infrequently used, its meaning often instead being expressed through a relativisation of the verb kufa "to die". Examples.

- ndege aliyekufa "dead bird" (bird which died, c.f. ndege mfu)
- ndege waliokufa "dead birds" (birds which died, c.f. ndege wafu)

Relativised verbs are frequently used in phrases describing time:

- wiki iliyopita "last week" (week which passed)
- wiki mbili zilizopita "two weeks ago (two weeks which passed)
- wiki ijayo "next week" (week which comes, coming week)
- wiki tatu zijazo "in three weeks" (three weeks which come, three coming weeks)
- mwaka uliopita "last year" (year which passed)
- miaka minne iliyopita "four years ago" (four years which passed)
- mwaka ujao "next year" (year which comes, coming year)
- miaka miwili ijayo "in two years" (two years which come, two coming years)

=== Genitive adjectives ===
Another construction which makes up for the paucity of true adjectives in Swahili is the genitive construction using the genitive preposition -a. The prefixes that this preposition takes are outlined here.

In many cases, the noun introduced in a genitive adjective phrase receives an additional ki- prefix, such as -a kimataifa "international" (from mataifa "nations") and -a kihistoria "historic" (from historia "history").

=== Ornative construction ===
Yet another construction which makes up for the paucity of true adjectives in Swahili is the ornative construction using -enye. Some examples of adjectival phrases with -enye include -enye nguvu "strong" (with strength), -enye nywele fupi "short-haired" (having short hair), and -enye senta moja "concentric" (having one centre). The forms of -enye as well as some more examples of use can be seen here.

== Verbs ==
Like nouns, verbs are formed by adding prefixes to a basic stem. However, unlike the prefixes of nouns, verbal prefixes are not a fixed part of the verb, but indicate subject, object, tense, aspect, mood and other inflectional categories. Normally, verbs are cited in dictionaries in the stem form, often with a hyphen to indicate that prefixes are added, such as -sema "say", -andika "write", -la "eat". It is also possible to use the infinitive/gerund form which begins with ku- or, for a couple of verbs only, kw-, such as kusema "to say", kuandika "to write", kula "to eat".

=== Overview of verb structure ===
Prefixes are always attached in a fixed order; the object prefix always comes last, immediately before the verb stem, while the subject prefix comes before the object prefix. Most of the time, a tense, aspect, mood or polarity prefix may intervene between the subject and object prefix, or be placed before the subject prefix. A common mnemonic used by learners of Swahili for the order of parts of a verb is STROVE.

- Subject prefix
- TAM prefix (or usually Tense prefix)
- Relative prefix
- Object prefix
- Verb stem
- Extension(s) (meaning "derivative suffix(es)"), or, more broadly Ending (including also the inflectional suffixes -i and -e).

In learner materials, all types of prefixes other than the subject prefixes are frequently referred to with the dated term "infix". The term infix, as used by linguists, would refer only to an affix that was inserted within the verbal root, not between the verbal root and another prefix, or between two other prefixes. Under the modern definition of the word, Swahili does not have infixes.

Here is an example of a verb with all slots filled:

S T R O V E
ni- -li- -po- -ku- -pik(a) (Note: This "(a)" appears when this is the final element of the word and is otherwise dropped.) -i(a)
1S- -PST- -CL16.REL- -2S- -cook -APPL
I earlier when you cook for
"when I cooked for you"

Most of the time, verbs will not have all slots filled. Here are some other examples.

S T R O V E
a- -na- — -ku- -pend(a) —
3S- -PRS- — -2S- -love —
s/he now — you love —
"s/he loves you"

S T R O V E
— — — -ni- -p(a) (Note: This "(a)" appears when this is the final element of the word and is otherwise dropped.) -e
— — — -1S- -give- -SBJV
— — — me give should/must
"give me"

S T R O V E
hatu- — — — -wez(a) -i
NEG.1P- — — — -be.able -NEG.PRES
{not we} — — — can {not now}
"we cannot" / "we are unable"

S T R O V E E E
hawa- — — — -l(a) -ish(a) -w(a) -i
NEG.3P- — — — -eat -CAUS -PASS -NEG.PRES
{not they} — — — eat make {be done} {not now}
"they do not get fed"

There are a number of derivational suffixes (frequently termed 'extensions') which can be added to the end of verbs to derive new meanings, some of which have been shown above.

=== Inflection groups ===
There are three basic inflection groups which differ only very slightly from one another:

1. common verbs
2. short verbs
3. loan verbs

Common verbs are the largest group of verbs in Swahili. In their infinitive form, they consist of three or more syllables and end with -a. All verbs of native Bantu origin end with -a, including the short verbs mentioned below. Some examples of common verbs are kuanguka "to fall", kufanya "to do, to make", kuona "to see", kuwaza "to think", kusaidia "to help". The final -a is replaced with another vowel in certain grammatical contexts, becoming -i in the present negative, and -e in the subjunctive and imperative forms involving an object prefix. The plural address marker -ni also triggers this final -a to become -e.

Short verbs are those which, in their infinitive form, consist of only two syllables, such as kula "to eat", kunywa "to drink", kuja "to come", kupa "to give". The verbs kwenda "to go" and kwisha "to finish" may belong to this group, although it is also common for these verbs to be conjugated as common verbs (as kuenda and kuisha). Because the stems of most of these verbs, once the infinitive prefix ku- is removed, are monosyllabic, these are frequently termed monosyllabic verbs, however this is problematic as the final -a of Bantu verbs is often not considered to be part of the root (meaning that roots of many of these verbs consists of only a single consonant or consonant cluster, such as -p- "give"). Furthermore, when the final -a is considered part of the stem, this excludes -enda and -isha, which generally conjugate in a similar way to the other short verbs. The short verbs are all native Bantu verbs ending in -a and undergo the same -i and -e alterations as the common verbs. Additionally, they are characterised by the insertion (or retention) of the syllable -ku- in certain verb forms. This intrusive -ku- (which may be glossed as EXT for "extension") prevents the penultimate stress from falling on certain TAM prefixes (-na-, -me-, -li-, -ta-, -sha-, -nge-, -ngeli-) and relative prefixes, which are inherently unable to be stressed. This -ku- disappears in verb forms where the stress is allowed to fall on a subject or object prefix, or on certain other TAM prefixes (-a-, hu-, -ki-, -ka-, -ku-, -si-). (The TAM prefix -ja- can be regarded as belonging to either group, depending on the speaker.) Because the initial stem vowel of -enda and -isha takes the stress, this explanation does not sufficiently fit, however it should suffice to say that the distribution of their -kw- extension, among speakers who use it, is identical to that of the -ku- extension in other short verbs.

The Loan verbs, also frequently called "Arabic" verbs, are those which do not end in -a in the infinitive. Not all verbs from Arabic are in this group, however, such as kusaidia, which is an Arabic loan which happens to end in -a and is thus conjugated as a common verb. Likewise, not all Loan verbs come from Arabic, such as kukisi "to kiss" and kuripoti "to report", which are from English. What these verbs share in common is that they are all loan-words and none of them end in -a. The consequence of this is that they do not take the suffixes -e and -i that the verbs ending in -a do, which occasionally results in ambiguity, such as in si-ku-sahau-~~Ø~~ which could either mean:

si- ku- sahau -~~Ø~~
NEG.1S- NEG.PST- forget -~~Ø~~
"I did not forget"

si- ku- sahau -~~Ø~~
NEG.1S- 2S- forget -~~PRES.NEG~~
"I do not forget you"

=== Subject and object concords ===
Both the subject and, when applicable, the object of the verb are indicated by prefixes or concords attached to the verb stem. Swahili is a pro-drop language: explicit personal pronouns are only used for emphasis, or with verb forms that do not indicate subject or object. When a noun is used as the subject or object, then the concord must match its class. Animate nouns (referring to a person or animal) are an exception and these occur with concords of the noun classes 1 (singular) or 2 (plural). The subject concord must always be present, except in the infinitive, habitual and imperative forms. The object concord is generally optional; although some sources maintain that it must always be used with animate objects, this appears not to be the case as counter-examples are commonplace. Whether it is used or not appears to have to do with animacy, specificity and definiteness as well as pragmatic considerations of emphasis.

Six different forms of verbal concord exist.

For the subject, there are both negative and positive forms, while there are only positive forms for objects. The negative subject concords are formed by prefixing the syllable ha- to the beginning, except for the irregular forms si- (instead of *hani-), hu- (instead of *hau-) and ha- (instead of *haa-) which are used, respectively, for first, second and third person singular animate subjects.

Additionally, in (the third person singular of) noun class 1, the prefix yu- is used instead of a- as the subject of a locative copula. (This yu- can also be seen in the demonstratives.) The negative form of yu- is formed regularly, by appending the prefix ha-.

Before the present 'indefinite' marker -a-, subject concords are shortened to just a consonant or consonant cluster in a similar manner to the prefix which occur on the genitive preposition -a.

Object concords are generally the same as the positive subject concord, although there are a few exceptions for instances involving animate referents; 2nd person singular and plural, as well as 3rd person singular (class 1) all have different forms for subject and object concord.

		Positive				Negative	
Person / Class		Subject Verb	Subject Locative	Object	Subject before -a-	Subject Verb	Subject Locative
1st sing.		ni-			n-	si-	
2nd sing.		u-		ku-	w-	hu-	
1st plur.		tu-			tw-	hatu-	
2nd plur.		m(w)-		wa-	mw-	ham-	
1	m-	a-	yu-	m(w)-	—N/a	ha-	hayu-
2	wa-	wa-			w-	hawa-	
3	m-	u-			w-	hau-	
4	mi-	i-			y-	hai-	
5	ji-	li-			l-	hali-	
6	ma-	ya-			y-	haya-	
7	ki-	ki-			ch-	haki-	
8	vi-	vi-			vy-	havi-	
9	N-	i-			y-	hai-	
10	N-	zi-			z-	hazi-	
11	u-	u-			w-	hau-	
14	u-	u-			w-	hau-	
15	ku-	ku-			kw-	haku-	
16	-ni/pa-	pa-			p-	hapa-	
17	-ni/ku-	ku-			kw-	haku-	
18	-ni/m-	m(u)-			mw-	ham(u)-	
reflexive		—N/a		ji-	—N/a	—N/a	

Examples:

- Tunakwenda sasa. "We are going now."
- Sisi tunakwenda sasa. "We are going now." (with emphasis)
- Ninamwona. "I see him/her."
- Ninamwona yeye. "I see him/her." (with emphasis)
- Ninampa zawadi. "I give him/her a gift."

Because the 2nd person plural object prefix -wa- is the same as the object prefix for class 2 (3rd person plural object), a word such as ninawaona may ambiguously mean "I see you all" or "I see them." These two possibilities may be disambiguated by placing the pronoun after the verb: ninawaona ninyi / wao. Very frequently, however, the suffix -eni is appended to the verb to indicate that the second person plural is meant: ninawaoneni "I see you all." This suffix causes the final a of Bantu verbs to shift to e. On loan verbs, this suffix is simply -ni. Some speakers use the prefix -ku- (otherwise indicating 2nd person singular) with the suffix -(e)ni, as in ninakuoneni "I see you all."

The reflexive prefix only occurs as an object, and refers back to the subject of the sentence. It is equivalent to English forms like myself, yourself, himself and so on.

- ninajitetea "I defend myself"
- anajiona "he sees himself" (idiomatically, may mean: "he is conceited")

=== Infinitive ===
The infinitive is a verbal noun, and belongs to the nominal class 15, which is reserved specifically for infinitives. It is marked by the prefix ku-. It may occur in the same contexts as other nouns and may, occasionally, even be derived into the locative classes by means of attaching the suffix -ni, as in kuangukani "in falling" (i.e. "while falling"). It corresponds to the English infinitive or gerund. Infinitives cannot take subject, relative or TAM prefixes, but they may take object prefixes.

Formation of the infinitive
	common verbs	short verbs	Loan verb
Affirmative	ku___a	ku___a	ku___
Affirmative	ku[OBJ]___a	ku[OBJ]___a	ku[OBJ]___
Negative	kuto(ku)___a	kutoku___a	kuto(ku)___
Negative	kuto(ku)[OBJ]___a	kuto(ku)[OBJ]___a	kuto(ku)[OBJ]___

The negative infinitive is derived from the verb kutoa "to subtract", "to not do", although it is rarely encountered in its full form for this use. The additional -ku- in brackets is the infinitive marker of the original verb, although it may be omitted as long as stress rules allow.

Examples
Verb	Affirmative infinitive	Negative infinitive
-wa	kuwa "to be, being"	kutokuwa "not to be, to not be, not being"
-nywa	kunywa "to drink, drinking"	kutokunywa "not to drink, to not drink, not drinking"
-nywa	kuyanywa "to drink it, drinking it" (class 6)	kuto(ku)yanywa "not to drink it, to not drink it, not drinking it"
-ona	kuona "to see, seeing"	kuto(ku)ona "not to see, to not see, not seeing"
-ona	kumwona "to see her/him"	kuto(ku)mwona "not to see, to not see, not seeing her/him"
-fanya	kufanya "to do/make"	kuto(ku)fanya "not to do/make, to not do/make, not doing/making"
-sahau	kusahau "to forget"	kuto(ku)sahau "not to forget, to not forget, not forgetting"

=== Tenses, aspects and moods ===
For the sake of simplicity, the following verb forms may be referred to as "tenses" as they often are in learner materials, but many of these are not grammatical tenses in the technical sense but may instead be aspects or moods. All together, Tense, Aspect and Mood may be abbreviated as TAM.

The following table shows a summary of TAM forms which will be discussed in further depth below. Brackets indicate optional elements and slashes indicate alternative elements of which either (but not both) may fill the same slot in the verb. The column labelled 'final vowel' is only relevant for "short" and "common verbs", with "loan verbs" remaining invariable here with the exception of the -ni suffix added to indicate 2nd person plural address. In any TAM form, when the object is 2nd person plural, this -(e)ni suffix may also occur, but this is not shown in this table.

Summary of TAM forms
	Tense, Aspect, Mood	Subject	TAM	Relative	Object / Extension	Verb STEM	Final Vowel	2P	Relative
Indicative; Basic; Tenses	Past	SUB	-li-	(REL)	(OBJ) / EXT	STEM	-a	—N/a	—N/a
Indicative; Basic; Tenses	Past Negative	NEG.SUB	-ku-	—N/a	(OBJ)	STEM	-a	—N/a	—N/a
Indicative; Basic; Tenses	Perfect	SUB	-me-	—N/a	(OBJ) / EXT	STEM	-a	—N/a	—N/a
Indicative; Basic; Tenses	Perfect Negative	NEG.SUB	-ja-	—N/a	(OBJ) / (EXT)	STEM	-a	—N/a	—N/a
Indicative; Basic; Tenses	Present 'Definite'	SUB	-na-	(REL)	(OBJ) / EXT	STEM	-a	—N/a	—N/a
Indicative; Basic; Tenses	Present 'Indefinite'	SUB (Note: Note that the 'indefinite' present -a- causes the form of the subject marker to change as outlined above.)	-a-	—N/a	(OBJ)	STEM	-a	—N/a	—N/a
Indicative; Basic; Tenses	Present Habitual	—N/a	hu-	—N/a	(OBJ)	STEM	-a	—N/a	—N/a
Indicative; Basic; Tenses	Present Negative	NEG.SUB	—N/a	—N/a	(OBJ)	STEM	-i	—N/a	—N/a
Indicative; Basic; Tenses	Future	SUB	-ta-	(-ka-REL)	(OBJ) / EXT	STEM	-a	—N/a	—N/a
Indicative; Basic; Tenses	Future Negative	NEG.SUB	-ta- / -to-	—N/a	(OBJ) / EXT	STEM	-a	—N/a	—N/a
Relative; Forms	Tenseless Relative	SUB	—N/a	—N/a	(OBJ)	STEM	-a-	—N/a	REL
Relative; Forms	Tenseless Negative Relative	SUB	-si-	REL	(OBJ)	STEM	-a	—N/a	—N/a
Contextual; Tenses	Situational	SUB	-ki-	—N/a	(OBJ)	STEM	-a	—N/a	—N/a
Contextual; Tenses	Consecutive	SUB	-ka-	—N/a	(OBJ)	STEM	-a	—N/a	—N/a
Irrealis	Irrealis Present	SUB	-nge-	—N/a	(OBJ) / EXT	STEM	-a	—N/a	—N/a
Irrealis	Irrealis Present Negative 1	SUB	-singe-	—N/a	(OBJ) / EXT	STEM	-a	—N/a	—N/a
Irrealis	Irrealis Present Negative 2	NEG.SUB	-nge-	—N/a	(OBJ) / EXT	STEM	-a	—N/a	—N/a
Irrealis	Irrealis Past	SUB	-ngali-	—N/a	(OBJ) / EXT	STEM	-a	—N/a	—N/a
Irrealis	Irrealis Past Negative 1	SUB	-singali-	—N/a	(OBJ) / EXT	STEM	-a	—N/a	—N/a
Irrealis	Irrealis Past Negative 2	NEG.SUB	-ngali-	—N/a	(OBJ) / EXT	STEM	-a	—N/a	—N/a
Imperatives and Subjunctives	Imperative Singular (- OBJ)	—N/a	—N/a	—N/a	— / EXT	STEM	-a	—N/a	—N/a
Imperatives and Subjunctives	Imperative Singular + OBJ	—N/a	—N/a	—N/a	OBJ	STEM	-e	—N/a	—N/a
Imperatives and Subjunctives	Imperative Plural	—N/a	—N/a	—N/a	(OBJ)	STEM	-e-	-ni	—N/a
Imperatives and Subjunctives	Subjunctive	SUB	—N/a	—N/a	(OBJ)	STEM	-e	—N/a	—N/a
Imperatives and Subjunctives	Subjunctive Negative	SUB	-si-	—N/a	(OBJ)	STEM	-e	—N/a	—N/a
Expeditive; Imperatives and Subjunctives	Expeditive Subjunctive	SUB	-ka-	—N/a	(OBJ)	STEM	-e	—N/a	—N/a
Expeditive; Imperatives and Subjunctives	Exp. Imperative Singular	—N/a	ka-	—N/a	(OBJ)	STEM	-e	—N/a	—N/a
Expeditive; Imperatives and Subjunctives	Exp. Imperative Plural	—N/a	ka-	—N/a	(OBJ)	STEM	-e-	-ni	—N/a

==== Imperative ====
The imperative mood is used to issue direct commands. It can occur either alone or with an object prefix. The presence of an object prefix (including the reflexive ji-) causes the final -a of Bantu verbs to become -e. Note that the ji- prefix of reflexive verbs is an object prefix, meaning, for example, that the imperative of -jifunza "to learn" is jifunze "learn!" and not *jifunza.

Formation of the imperative
	Common verbs	Short verbs	Loan verb
Singular	___a	ku___a	___
Singular	[OBJ]___e	[OBJ]___e	[OBJ]___
Plural	___eni	ku___eni	___ni
Plural	[OBJ]___eni	[OBJ]___eni	[OBJ]___ni

The plural form, with the suffix -ni, is used when addressing multiple people.

The following verbs have irregular imperatives, regular forms may be heard, particularly by non-native speakers and particularly in Kenya, and regular forms may be interpreted as less polite:

- kuja "to come": njoo (pl. njooni)
- kwenda "to go" : nenda (pl. nendeni)
- kuleta "to bring": lete (pl. leteni)

The verb -acha may informally be given the imperative form wacha (pl. wacheni).

Additionally, the verb kuwa "to be" has an irregular imperative form: iwe (pl. iweni), although this is rarely used and more frequently replaced by a regular imperative form kuwa (pl. kuweni) or used in the subjunctive ("polite imperative") form: uwe (pl. mwe).

Examples (singular then plural)
Verb	Alone	With object
-nywa	Kunywa! Kunyweni! "Drink!"	Yanywe! Yanyweni! "Drink it!" (class 6)
-angalia	Angalia! Angalieni! "Look!"	Mwangalie! Mwangalieni! "Look at her!"
-saidia	Saidia! Saidieni! "Help!"	Nisaidie! Nisaidieni! "Help me!"
-jibu	Jibu! Jibuni! "Answer!"	Nijibu! Nijibuni! "Answer me!"
-jifunza	N/A	Jifunze! Jifunzeni! "Learn!"

There is no actual negative imperative form. The equivalent is achieved with the negative subjunctive (as in Spanish). The formation of this is outlined below, but for the sake of completeness the negative equivalents of the above examples are given here.

Examples (singular then plural)
Verb	Alone	With object
-nywa	Usinywe! Msinywe! "Don't drink!"	Usiyanywe! Msiyanywe! "Don't drink it!" (class 6)
-angalia	Usiangalie! Msiangalie! "Don't look!"	Usimwangalie! Msimwangalie! "Don't look at her!"
-saidia	Usisaidie! Msisaidie! "Don't help!"	Usinisaidie! Msinisaidie! "Don't help me!"
-jibu	Usijibu! Msijibu! "Don't answer!"	Usinijibu! Msinijibu! "Don't answer me!"
-jifunza	N/A	Usijifunze! Msijifunze! "Don't learn!"

The suffix -ni is used when the order is addressed to each of the people. When an order is given to any of the addressed persons the subjunctive mood is used.

For instance when a load is meant to be carried, if it is heavy and all the people should help, Bebeni mzigo. When anyone could help carrying on their own Mbebe mzigo. When introducing people in a waiting room, Mkae hapa implies that all the people will be called together. Kaeni hapa implies that anyone could sit and they will be called one by one. The suffix -ni is thus the locative suffix which specifies that the order is given to everyone, distinctly in the time-space.

==== Present tenses ====
There are two present tenses in Swahili. These are sometimes termed the "definite present" (with -na-) and the "indefinite present" (with -a-). In modern, standard Swahili, however, there is no great difference in meaning between these two forms as the "indefinite present" is more or less obsolete and rarely used other than its frequent appearance in media headlines. A distinction between these two forms is not made in the negative, with both forms being negated the same way.

Formation of the present tense
	Common Verb	Short Verb	Loan verb
"definite present"	[SUBJ]na___a	[SUBJ]naku___a	[SUBJ]na___
"definite present"	[SUBJ]na[OBJ]___a	[SUBJ]na[OBJ]___a	[SUBJ]na[OBJ]___
"indefinite present" (almost obsolete)	[SUBJ (Note: Although rarely used, the "indefinite present" adds a small complication to the presentation of Swahili grammar as the -a- marking the tense causes the subject concords to undergo reduction in the same manner as the prefixes of the genitive preposition -a. This is outlined above.)]a___a	[SUBJ]a___a	[SUBJ]a___
"indefinite present" (almost obsolete)	[SUBJ]a[OBJ]___a	[SUBJ]a[OBJ]___a	[SUBJ]a[OBJ]___
negative present	[NEG.SUBJ]___i	[NEG.SUBJ]___i	[NEG.SUBJ]___
negative present	[NEG.SUBJ][OBJ]___i	[NEG.SUBJ][OBJ]___i	[NEG.SUBJ][OBJ]___

In informal Swahili, it is very common for the first person singular concord ni- to collapse into the -na- of the definite present tense marker and become inaudible (and unwritten). The distinction between the "definite" and "indefinite" present tense forms appears to vanish in the first person as both begin with a na-, however short verbs retain their -ku- extension in the -na- tense and lose it in the -a- tense, allowing this distinction to still be felt, such as in (ni)nakula "I eat", in the -na- present tense, versus nala "I eat", in the -a- present tense.

Examples ("definite", "indefinite", negative)
Verb	Example	Notes
-enda	Anakwenda. "She goes" / "She's going."	(Anaenda is also used.)
-enda	Aenda. "She goes."	
-enda	Haendi. "She doesn't go." / "She isn't going."	
-la	(Ni)nakula. "I eat." / "I am eating."	Short verb: -ku- prevents -na- from being stressed
-la	Nala. "I eat."	Short verb: -a- has no problem taking stress.
-la	Sili. "I'm not eating." / "I don't eat."	Short verb: si-, like all subject/object prefixes, can take stress
-andika	Unaandika. "You write." / "You are writing."	
-andika	Waandika. "You write."	May also mean "They write." U- + a- = wa-; wa- + -a- = wa-
-andika	Huandiki. "You don't write." / "You aren't writing."	
-jibu	Tunajibu. "We answer" / "We are answering."	
-jibu	Twajibu. "We answer."	
-jibu	Hatujibu. "We don't answer." / "We are not answering."	Loan verb, no -a suffix to be changed to -i.

==== Habitual ====
The habitual verb form is unusual in that it does not allow subject prefixes to appear on it. The prefix hu- is added to the beginning of the verb and short verbs do not need their -ku- extension.

Formation of the habitual
	Common Verb	Short Verb	Loan verb
positive future	hu([OBJ])___a	hu([OBJ])___a	hu([OBJ])___

The habitual indicates repeated, habitual occurrence of an action (habitual aspect) or something occurring as a timeless general rule (gnomic aspect). Because subject prefixes are absent, personal pronouns are very frequently used to indicate the subject.

ng'ombe hu-l(a) nyasi
head(s).of.cattle(CL9/CL10) HAB-eat grass(CL10)
cow(s) {eat(s), as a rule} grass
"Cows eat grass." / "A cow eats grass."

sisi hu-nyw(a) bia kila wikendi
1P HAB-drink beer(CL9/CL10) every weekend(CL9)
we {drink(s), as a rule} beer every weekend
"We drink beer every weekend."

The habitual aspect with hu- is often replaced by the present with -na- in everyday use, the sisi hunywa of the above example then being replaced with tunakunywa. In order to maintain the habitual meaning, the word huwa (the habitual form of kuwa "to be") may precede the verb, such as Huwa tunakunywa. This may be regarded as an example of a compound tense, however because of the invariability of huwa, it may also be regarded simply as an adverb with the meaning "habitually".

In the informal speech of some regions, speakers instead make frequent use of the non-standard habitual suffix -ga or -nga, which has entered Swahili from other Bantu languages spoken in East Africa, giving forms such as tunakunywaga or tunakunywanga for "we habitually drink". These suffixes mean either the performance of an action as a habit or that it occurs "once in a while", as these examples show:

- Umewahi kwenda Morogoro? "Have you ever been to Morogoro?"

→ Naendaga "Yeah, I go there (habitually/from time to time).

- Wee unacheza ngoma? "You do you dance to traditional music?" (Wee is an informal form of wewe.)

→ Nachezaga "Yeah, I do."
→ Sichezagi "No, I don't."

Although there are many ways in which the habitual aspect with hu- is avoided in informal speech, it is, however, very commonly used in proverbs dealing with eternal truisms.

haba na haba hu-ja(a)-z(a) kibaba
insignificant COM insignificant HAB-become.full-CAUS 1.56.litre.container(CL7)
little and little {fills, as a rule} container
"Little by little, a cup is filled."
(Roughly equivalent to "Slow and steady wins the race," or "A penny saved is a penny earned.")

In generalisations about the habits of groups of people, speakers often synecdochically pair a singular subject with a verb taking the hu- prefix. Mtanzania hulala uchi "A Tanzanian sleeps naked." ("Tanzanians sleep naked.") Informally, however, the present tense with -na- may be used in this way as well: Mfaransa anakula chura, "A French person eats frogs." ("French people eat frogs.") Pointing out an eagle hovering above a hamlet, Yule mtu anakula kuku, "That type of guy eats chicken."

==== Past ====
The past tense is used in Swahili to talk about actions or states in the past, whether in the near or the distant past. It is formed with the prefix -li-. Its negative equivalent is formed with the negative subject prefix plus -ku-. The positive tense marker -li- cannot take stress and triggers the use of the extension -ku- (or -kw-) where necessary. The negative tense marker -ku- can take stress, meaning that an additional -ku- extension is not needed.

Formation of the past tense
	Common Verb	Short Verb	Loan verb
positive past	[SUBJ]li___a	[SUBJ]liku___a	[SUBJ]li___
positive past	[SUBJ]li[OBJ]___a	[SUBJ]li[OBJ]___a	[SUBJ]li[OBJ]___
negative past	[NEG.SUBJ]ku___a	[NEG.SUBJ]ku___a	[NEG.SUBJ]ku___
negative past	[NEG.SUBJ]ku[OBJ]___a	[NEG.SUBJ]ku[OBJ]___a	[NEG.SUBJ]ku[OBJ]___

Examples
Verb	Example	Notes
-enda	Alikwenda. "She went."	Alienda is also used.
-enda	Hakwenda. "She didn't go."	The -kw- marks the negative past and cannot be dropped. Hakuenda may also be encountered.
-la	Nilikula. "I ate."	Short verb: -ku- prevents -li- from being stressed
-la	Sikula. "I didn't eat."	The -ku- marks the negative past and cannot be dropped.
-andika	Uliandika. "You wrote."	
-andika	Hukuandika. "You didn't write."	
-jibu	Tulijibu. "We answered."	
-jibu	Hatukujibu. "We didn't answer."	

==== Perfect ====
The perfect indicates an action or situation which occurred in the past, similarly to the past tense, however the focus of the utterance is on the relevance of this past action to the present moment. For example, the word nimepika "I have cooked" describes a past action with present relevance (i.e. the food is ready now) whereas nilipika "I cooked" describes a past action with no implication of any relevance to the present (the food may have been eaten long ago, or not).

The perfect is formed in the positive with the prefix -me-. The negative is formed with the negative subject prefix plus -ja-. As with the present and past tenses, the positive present marker -me- cannot take the word stress and triggers the appearance of the -ku- extension in short verbs, but the negative marker -ja- is able to be stressed. Some speakers may use the extension -ku- with -ja-.

Some sources describe the -ja- form as containing more of an implication of "not yet" than a simple negation of the -me- form, however the word bado "still", "not yet" may be used to indicate this explicitly where necessary.

Formation of the perfect tense
	Common Verb	Short Verb	Loan verb
positive perfect	[SUBJ]me___a	[SUBJ]meku___a	[SUBJ]me___
positive perfect	[SUBJ]me[OBJ]___a	[SUBJ]me[OBJ]___a	[SUBJ]me[OBJ]___
negative perfect	[NEG.SUBJ]ja___a	[NEG.SUBJ]ja(ku)___a	[NEG.SUBJ]ja___
negative perfect	[NEG.SUBJ]ja[OBJ]___a	[NEG.SUBJ]ja[OBJ]___a	[NEG.SUBJ]ja[OBJ]___

Examples
Verb	Example	Notes
-enda	Amekwenda. "She has gone/been."	Ameenda is also used.
-enda	Hajaenda. "She hasn't gone/been."	
-la	Nimekula. "I have eaten."	Short verb: -ku- prevents -me- from being stressed
-la	Sijala. "I haven't eaten."	Sijakula may also be encountered.
-andika	Umeandika. "You have written."	
-andika	Hujaandika. "You haven't written."	
-jibu	Tumejibu. "We have answered."	
-jibu	Hatujajibu. "We haven't answered."	

Inchoative verbs, such as kuchoka "to get tired", which describe the entering of a state, are used in the perfect to indicate being in the state in question. Compare for example: ninachoka "I am becoming tired"; nimechoka "I have become tired", i.e. "I am tired." For more information and examples, see the section on inchoative verbs below.

Some speakers may replace the sequence of prefixes a-me- with ka- with more or less the same meaning. This may derive from the consecutive tense marker.

paka w-angu a-me-pote(a) (CL9)cat(s) CL1-GEN.1S CL1-PRF-get.lost cat my s/he-has-gotten-lost "My cat is lost."	↔	paka w-angu ka-pote(a) (CL9)cat(s) CL1-GEN.1S CL1.PRF-get.lost cat my s/he-has-gotten-lost "My cat is lost."

==== Anterior -sha- ====
The anterior marker -sha- (or sometimes -kwisha-) is a relatively new TAM marker that derives diachronically from the verb kwisha "to finish, to run out". It is most commonly (and perhaps least controversially) used directly after the perfect marker -me-. It often imparts the meaning of "already", emphasising the completeness of the action.

asante ni-me-sha-ku-l(a)
thank.you 1S-PRF-ANT-EXT-eat
{thank you} {I have already eaten}
"No thank you, I have already eaten."

The anterior marker -sha- is also used with other TAM markers, simply sitting after them within the TAM slot. It may also on occasion be used on its own, with a function more or less equivalent to the perfect -me-. These uses may not be regarded as standard Swahili. It is frequently used with the situational marker -ki- where it indicates a situation in which the action has been completed.

u-ki-sha-pat(a) kazi u-ta-ku-w(a) na pesa z-a ku-tosh(a)
2S-SITU-ANT-get work(CL9) 2S-FUT-EXT-be COM money(CL10) CL10-GEN INF(CL15)-suffice
{once you get} work {you will be} with money of {to suffice}
"Once you get a job, you will have enough money."

==== Future ====
The future tense is formed in Swahili with the prefix -ta-. The negative form is indicated simply by using the negative subject prefix, with -ta- being used here as well. A number of speakers, however, use -to- in the negative future. This may be derived by analogy from the -to- of the negative infinitive, and may also disambiguate between positive and negative where the only difference otherwise would be an h- at the beginning of the negative word. For example, atakuja "s/he will come" vs. hatakuja "s/he will not come" (or hatokuja). Because second language speakers in many areas have trouble with pronouncing and distinguishing /h/, the optional change from -ta- to -to- in the negative can provide a failsafe indication when a negative meaning is intended.

-Ta- (and likewise -to-) cannot take the word stress whether in positive or negative and thus causes the appearance of the -ku- extension in short verbs.

Formation of the future tense
	Common Verb	Short Verb	Loan verb
positive future	[SUBJ]ta___a	[SUBJ]taku___a	[SUBJ]ta___
positive future	[SUBJ]ta[OBJ]___a	[SUBJ]ta[OBJ]___a	[SUBJ]ta[OBJ]___
negative future (usual)	[NEG.SUBJ]ta___a	[NEG.SUBJ]taku___a	[NEG.SUBJ]ta___
negative future (usual)	[NEG.SUBJ]ta[OBJ]___a	[NEG.SUBJ]ta[OBJ]___a	[NEG.SUBJ]ta[OBJ]___
negative future (variant)	[NEG.SUBJ]to___a	[NEG.SUBJ]toku___a	[NEG.SUBJ]to___
negative future (variant)	[NEG.SUBJ]to[OBJ]___a	[NEG.SUBJ]to[OBJ]___a	[NEG.SUBJ]to[OBJ]___

Examples
Verb	Example	Notes
-enda	Atakwenda. "She will go."	Ataenda is also used.
-enda	Hatakwenda. "She won't go."	Hataenda is also used.
-la	Nitakula. "I will eat."	Short verb: -ku- prevents -ta- from being stressed
-la	Sitakula. "I won't eat."	Short verb: -ku- prevents -ta- from being stressed
-andika	Utaandika. "You will write."	
-andika	Hutaandika. "You won't write."	
-jibu	Tutajibu. "We will answer."	
-jibu	Hatutajibu. "We won't answer."	

==== Subjunctive ====
The subjunctive (sometimes referred to as an optative) expresses hypothetical situations, wishes and requests. It is also used as a complement to certain auxiliary verbs and conjunctions. The subjunctive is indicated by the lack of any Tense-Aspect-Mood prefix and the change of the final -a, where present, to -e-. The class of loan verbs, which do not end in -a, do not undergo this change and the subjunctive form is made by simply omitting any tense marker. The negative subjunctive is indicated by adding the syllable -si- into the tense slot, with the positive subject prefix being used rather than the negative.

Formation of the subjunctive
	Common Verb	Short Verb	Loan verb
positive subjunctive	[SUBJ]___e	[SUBJ]___e	[SUBJ]___
positive subjunctive	[SUBJ][OBJ]___e	[SUBJ][OBJ]___e	[SUBJ][OBJ]___
negative subjunctive	[SUBJ]si___e	[SUBJ]si___e	[SUBJ]si___
negative subjunctive	[SUBJ]si[OBJ]___e	[SUBJ]si[OBJ]___e	[SUBJ]si[OBJ]___

Examples
Verb	Example
-enda	Aende. "He should go." / "... him to go" / "... that he go"
-enda	Asiende. "He shouldn't go." / "... him not to go" / "... that he not go"
-la	Nile. "I should eat." / "... me to eat" / "... that I eat"
-la	Nisile. "I shouldn't eat." / "... me not to eat" / "... that I not eat"
-andika	Uandike. "You should write." / "... you to write" / "... that you write"
-andika	Usiandike. "Don't write!" / "You shouldn't write." / "... you not to write" / "... that you not write"
-sahau	Tusahau. "Let's forget!" / "We should forget." / "... us to forget" / "... that we forget"
-sahau	Tusisahau. "Let's not forget." / "We shouldn't forget." / "... us not to forget" / "... that we not forget"

The subjunctive is frequently used following the equivalents of modal verbs, verbs indicating wishes, suggestions, recommendations and other constructions.

ni-li-mw-ambi(a) a-end(a)-e 1S.SBJ-PST-3S.ANIM.OBJ-tell 3S.ANIM.SBJ-go-SBJV "I told her/him to go." / "I told her/him she/he should go."	↔	ni-li-mw-ambi(a) a-si-end(a)-e 1S.SBJ-PST-3S.ANIM.OBJ-tell 3S.ANIM.SBJ-NEG-go-SBJV "I told her/him not to go." / "I told her/him she/he should not go."

tu-ta-wa-omb(a) wa-ka(a)-e 1P.SBJ-FUT-3P.ANIM.OBJ-request 3P.ANIM-sit-SBJV "We will ask them to sit."	↔	tu-ta-wa-omb(a) wa-si-ka(a)-e 1P.SBJ-FUT-3P.ANIM.OBJ-request 3P.ANIM-NEG-sit-SBJV "We will ask them not to sit."

ni-na-tak(a) u-j(a)-e 1P.SBJ-PRES-want 2S.SBJ-come-SBJV "I want you to come."	↔	si-tak(a)-i u-j(a)-e NEG.1P.SBJ-want-NEG.PRES 2S.SBJ-come-SBJV "I don't want you to come."	↔	ni-na-tak(a) u-si-j(a)-e 1P.SBJ-PRES-want 2S.SBJ-NEG-come-SBJV "I want you not to come."

The verb kutaka and such verbs expressing wishes or intentions like kutegemea to intend are usually followed by the subjunctive even when the subject is the same in both propositions; Nataka niende sokoni I want to go to the market. Mtoto alipewa kitabu asome The child was given a book so that he could study. Sisi tunategemea tuende picha usiku We've planned to go to the theatre (movies) tonight. It applies when there a possibility of influencing the factors encountered in the context. If there is nothing to do about the context then the infinitive is used.

Wale watu wanataka kutawala dunia Those people want to rule the world.
Nataka kukojoa I want to piss
Anataka kufa He wants to die (He's going to die)
Wale wageni wanataka kuondoka The guests want to leave

Compare with: Nataka nikojolee chooni I want to piss in the toilet. Walitaka waondoke mapema They wanted to leave early (and they didn't wake up) Walitaka kuondoka mapema They wanted to leave early (and the road was flooded)

An equivalent of "must" or "have to" is formed with ni lazima "it is necessary", or simply lazima "necessarily" followed by the subjunctive.

(ni) lazima u-lal-e (COP) necessary 2S.SBJ-sleep-SBJV "You must sleep." "It is necessary that you sleep."	↔	si lazima u-lal-e NEG.COP necessarily 2S.SBJ-sleep-SBJV "You don't have to sleep." "It is not necessary that you sleep."	↔	(ni) lazima u-si-lal-e (COP) necessary 2S.SBJ-NEG-sleep-SBJV "You must not sleep." "It is necessary that you not sleep."

The subjunctive may be used on its own with a second person subject as a more polite alternative to an imperative. As there is no negative imperative, forms beginning with usi- and msi- may also be interpreted as such.

Ø-tok(a)-Ø; IMP-got.out-2S.SBJ "Go away." "Get lost."	↔	u-tok(a)-e 2S.SBJ-go.out-SBJV "You should go away!" "Can you (please) go away!"	↔	u-si-tok(a)-e 2S.SBJ-not-go.out-SBJV "Don't go away!" "You should not go away!"

==== Situational ====
The situational, simultaneous or conditional tense is formed with the TAM prefix -ki-. This prefix may take stress and thus the extension -ku- does not appear with short verbs in the situational verb form.

There is, strictly speaking, no negative form of the situational, however, in conditional sentences, the relative verb form using -sipo- is quite close in meaning to a negative equivalent of -ki- and it will be given here as it may prove helpful. Note that the -ku- extension does appear with -sipo- as the -po-, like all relative syllables, is unable to be stressed.

Formation of the situational
	Common Verb	Short Verb	Loan verb
positive situational	[SUBJ]ki___a	[SUBJ]ki___a	[SUBJ]ki___
positive situational	[SUBJ]ki[OBJ]___a	[SUBJ]ki[OBJ]___a	[SUBJ]ki[OBJ]___
negative situational (conditional only)	[SUBJ]sipo___a	[SUBJ]sipoku___a	[SUBJ]sipo___
negative situational (conditional only)	[SUBJ]sipo[OBJ]___a	[SUBJ]sipo[OBJ]___a	[SUBJ]sipo[OBJ]___

The situational verb form is used to indicate a simultaneous action or situation of subordinate importance that provides the temporal or contextual background for the main verb in the sentence. It is somewhat equivalent to the English conjunctions "if" and "when", but it also forms the equivalent of adverbial participle clauses. If needed for clarity or emphasis, a word meaning if, such as kama, ikiwa or endapo may be added to the beginning of the clause (which allows the speaker to choose a different TAM marker). The word ikiwa is itself the situational form of the verb -wa "to be", with the class 9 subject prefix i-, literally meaning on its own essentially "if it is".

(kama) u-ki-tak(a) ku-j(a) u-ta-pas(a)-w(a) ku-lip(a)
(if) 2S.SBJ-SITU-want INF(CL15)-come 2S.SBJ-FUT-behoove-PASS INF(CL15)-pay
(if) {if you want} {to come} {you will be behooved} {to pay}
"If you want to come, you will have to pay."

(kama) u-si-po-tak(a) ku-j(a) hu-ta-pas(a)-w(a) ku-lip(a)
(if) 2S.SBJ-NEG-CL16.REL-want INF(CL15)-come NEG.2S.SBJ-FUT-behoove-PASS INF(CL15)-pay
(if) {if you don't want} {to come} {you will not be behooved} {to pay}
"If you don't want to come, you will not have to pay."

wanajeshi wa-wili wa-li-ku-j(a) wa-ki-kimbia w-ote wa-wili wa-ki-beb(a) upanga
soldiers(CL2) CL2-two CL2.SBJ-PST-EXT-come CL2.SBJ-SITU-run CL2-all CL2-two CL2.SBJ-SITU-carry machete(CL11)
soldiers two {they came} {(they) running} all two {(they) carrying} machete
"Two soldiers came running, both of them carrying a machete."

The situational may appear in compound progressive tenses.

tu-li-po-fik(a) a-li-ku-w(a) a-ki-l(a) kwa pupa haraka i-wezekan(a)-vyo
1P.SBJ-PST-CL16.REL-arrive CL1.SBJ-PST-EXT-be CL2.SBJ-SITU-eat INST greed(CL9) quickly CL9.SBJ-be.possible-CL8.REL
{when we arrived} {he was} {(he) eating} with greed quickly {as it is possible}
"When we arrived, he was (in the middle of) eating greedily as quickly as possible."

==== Consecutive ====
The consecutive or narrative tense is formed with the TAM prefix -ka-. This prefix may take stress and thus the extension -ku- does not appear with short verbs in this form.

Formation of the consecutive
	Common Verb	Short Verb	Loan verb
positive consecutive	[SUBJ]ka___a	[SUBJ]ka___a	[SUBJ]ka___
positive consecutive	[SUBJ]ka[OBJ]___a	[SUBJ]ka[OBJ]___a	[SUBJ]ka[OBJ]___

The consecutive tense is mainly used with the past tense -li- in narrating a sequence of events whereby -li- is used for the first verb and -ka- for subsequent verbs. It roughly carries the meaning "and then" and makes the use of na "and" or halafu / kisha "then" essentially redundant. Where context is clearly past, a narrative may also be begun with -ka-.

a-li-po-mw-on(a) nyoka a-li-vua shati a-ka-li-tup(a) juu y-a nyoka a-ka-m-kanyag(a)
CL1-PST-CL.16.REL-CL.1-see snake(CL9) CL1-PST-take.off shirt(CL5) CL1-CNSC-CL5-throw top(CL9) CL9-GEN snake(CL9) CL1-CNSC-CL1-trample
{when he saw it} snake {he took off} shirt {he then threw it (the shirt)} {on top} of snake {he then trampled it (the snake)}
"Upon seeing the snake, he took off his shirt, threw it over the snake and then trampled on it."

There is, strictly speaking, no negative form of the consecutive, however the negative subjunctive may occasionally be used for this purpose.

ni-li-duwa(a) ni-si-w(a)-e na l-a ku-sem(a)
1S-PST-be.dumbfounded 1S-NEG-be-SBJV COM CL5-GEN INF(CL15)-say
{I was dumbfounded} {and then was not} with {(word) of} {to say}
"I was dumbfounded and (then) didn't have anything to say."

==== Expeditous ====
The consecutive marker -ka- may combine with the final -e of the subjunctive mood to form the expeditous.

Formation of the expeditous
	Common Verb	Short Verb	Loan verb
positive expeditous	[SUBJ]ka___e	[SUBJ]ka___e	[SUBJ]ka___
positive expeditous	[SUBJ]ka[OBJ]___e	[SUBJ]ka[OBJ]___e	[SUBJ]ka[OBJ]___

The expeditous verb form is essentially the same as the subjunctive in meaning except with the added meaning of "and" or "then" introduced by the consecutive marker -ka-.

tu-li-m-pelek(a) kule Misri a-ka-w(a)-e balozi w-etu katika nchi hiyo
1P-PST-CL1-send DEM.CL17.DIST Egypt CL1-CNSC-be-SBJV ambassador(CL5) CL1-GEN.1P in country(CL9) DEM.CL9.MED
{we sent him} there Egypt {that he then become} ambassador our in country {that aforementioned}
"We sent him to Egypt (for him) to be our ambassador in that country."

The word akawe in the above sentence could also be replaced with ili awe "in order that he be" or simply the subjunctive awe "that he be" (or "(for him) to be" in more natural contemporary English), but the -ka- added to this word emphasises his becoming an ambassador immediately following his being dispatched.

The expeditous verb form is frequently used with imperatives (and "polite imperatives" in the subjunctive), again indicating roughly "and then".

u-end(a)-e mbele y-angu u-ka-w(a)-e m-kamilifu
2S.SBJ-go-SBJV front.side(CL9) CL9-GEN.1S 2S.SBJ-CNSC-be-SBJV CL1-perfect
go {in front} {of me} {and be} perfect
"Go in front of me and be perfect."

The subject prefix may be dropped when used with the imperative.

nenda (u-)ka-mw-ambi(a)-e ukweli
go.IMP.2S (2S.SUBJ-)CNSC-CL1.OBJ-tell-SBJV truth(CL14)
go {and tell her} truth
"Go and tell her the truth!"

==== Irrealis ====
There are two irrealis verb forms, one which may be called "present irrealis" (marked by -nge-) and one which may be called "past irrealis" (marked by -ngali-). The standard means of forming the negative is to use -si- in the TAM slot, forming -singe- and -singali-. Some speakers, however, particularly in speech influenced by southern dialects, negate the irrealis verb forms instead by using the negative subject concords.

Formation of the present irrealis
	Common Verb	Short Verb	Loan verb
positive present irrealis	[SUBJ]nge___a	[SUBJ]ngeku___a	[SUBJ]nge___
positive present irrealis	[SUBJ]nge[OBJ]___a	[SUBJ]nge[OBJ]___a	[SUBJ]nge[OBJ]___
negative present irrealis	[SUBJ]singe___a	[SUBJ]singeku___a	[SUBJ]singe___
negative present irrealis	[SUBJ]singe[OBJ]___a	[SUBJ]singe[OBJ]___a	[SUBJ]singe[OBJ]___
negative present irrealis (variant)	[NEG.SUBJ]nge___a	[NEG.SUBJ]ngeku___a	[NEG.SUBJ]nge___
negative present irrealis (variant)	[NEG.SUBJ]nge[OBJ]___a	[NEG.SUBJ]nge[OBJ]___a	[NEG.SUBJ]nge[OBJ]___

Formation of the past irrealis
	Common Verb	Short Verb	Loan verb
positive past irrealis	[SUBJ]ngali___a	[SUBJ]ngaliku___a	[SUBJ]ngali___
positive past irrealis	[SUBJ]ngali[OBJ]___a	[SUBJ]ngali[OBJ]___a	[SUBJ]ngali[OBJ]___
negative past irrealis	[SUBJ]singali___a	[SUBJ]singaliku___a	[SUBJ]singali___
negative past irrealis	[SUBJ]singali[OBJ]___a	[SUBJ]singali[OBJ]___a	[SUBJ]singali[OBJ]___
negative past irrealis (variant)	[NEG.SUBJ]ngali___a	[NEG.SUBJ]ngaliku___a	[NEG.SUBJ]ngali___
negative past irrealis (variant)	[NEG.SUBJ]ngali[OBJ]___a	[NEG.SUBJ]ngali[OBJ]___a	[NEG.SUBJ]ngali[OBJ]___

Both the irrealis forms are used to discuss hypothetical situations, generally within conditional sentences. Both the protasis (if-clause) and apodosis (then-clause) may have an identical structure with the protasis appearing first. In order to disambiguate or emphasise, such as if the clauses are in the reverse order, a word for "if" (kama, ikiwa, endapo) may precede the protasis.

ni-nge-pend(a) ku-ku-on(a) tena
1S.SBJ-IRR-like/love INF(CL15)-2S.OBJ-see again
{I would like} {to see you} again
"I would like to see you again"

(i-ki-w(a)) ni-nge-ku-w(a) ndege ni-nge-ku-ny(a)-e(a) kichwa
(CL9-SITU-be) 1S-IRR-EXT-be bird(CL9) 1S.SUBJ-IRR-2S.OBJ-defecate-APPL head(CL7)
{if (it is)} {if I were} bird {I would defecate on you} head
"If I were a bird, I would defecate on your head."

(kama) ni-ngali-ju(a) hiyo ni-si-ngali-ku-j(a) hapa
(if) 1S-IRR.PST-know DEM.CL9.MED 1S-NEG-IRR.PST-EXT-know DEM.CL16.PROX
(if) {if I had known} {that aforementioned} {I would not have come} here
"If I had known that, I would not have come here!"

In the usage of many speakers, the distinction between the present and past irrealis forms is somewhat blurred so that the final example above may commonly be spoken as "(Kama) ningejua hiyo, nisingekuja hapa." which, speaking strictly, could be interpreted as "If I knew that I would not come here."

=== Relative verb forms ===
There are five verb templates which can be used to create relative clauses. The three simple tenses PAST, PRESENT and FUTURE may only be relativised in their positive sense. In addition to these, there is a tenseless positive form and a tenseless negative form. For all other verb forms, relative clauses must be formed by a periphrastic relative using amba-.

The following table shows the structure of the verb templates, notably the positioning of the relative morpheme, here labelled "REL". Note in the following table that the marker for the future tense is -taka- with a following relative morpheme, rather than the simple -ta- which occurs otherwise.

Tense, Aspect, Mood		Subject	TAM	Relative	Object / Extension	Verb STEM	Final Vowel	Relative
Tensed	Past Positive	SUB	-li-	REL	(OBJ) / EXT	STEM	-a	—N/a
Tensed	Present Positive	SUB	-na-	REL	(OBJ) / EXT	STEM	-a	—N/a
Tensed	Future Positive	SUB	-taka-	REL	(OBJ) / EXT	STEM	-a	—N/a
Tenseless	Positive	SUB	—N/a	—N/a	(OBJ)	STEM	-a-	REL
Tenseless	Negative	SUB	-si-	REL	(OBJ)	STEM	-a	—N/a

The relative morpheme takes one of many forms to indicate the class of its referent. The relative morpheme for each class is identical to its combining pronominal form which appears with na- and ndi-. Aside from class 1, the form of each can be achieved by placing o (the so-called "o of reference")

Class	Relative Morpheme
1	-ye
2	-o
3	-o
4	-yo
5	-lo
6	-yo
7	-cho
8	-vyo
9	-yo
10	-zo
11	-o
14	-o
15	-ko
16	-po
17	-ko
18	-mo

The tenseless relative form is used when expressing a general meaning or a habit: Wakao hapa The ones who (usually) sit here. Usiache mbachao kwa msala ujao Don't leave a rotten mat for a (nice) praying mat which may come (A bird in your hand is better that two birds in the bush). Kitabu hichi ndicho nikitafutacho This the book I look around (I've been seeking for ages). It is also used in some copula Kitabu nilicho nacho The book I am with (the book which is with me).

The tensed aspect is connected to a specific time either in the present, the future or in the past. Therefore, it is used with a definite past -li- and not with the recent past -me-. The relative is the same expressing the subject (who) or the object (that, which).

Kitu kilichonipendeza The thing which pleased me
Kitu nilichokipenda The thing I liked

Chagua matunda yale yaliyoiva Choose the fruit the ones which are ripe.
Chagua yale uliyoweka pembeni Choose the ones you put aside.
"Kituo kinachofuata Faya" The next stop (which follows) is Fire.

Yule aliyekuja sasa hivi kashaondoka The one who came at the moment has gone already.
Wanaokaa hapa wazee The ones who are seated here are the Elders.

The periphrastic relative amba- was coined a hundred years ago by foreigners who did not like much the affix -o- and its nuances. It is nowadays widely spread in big cities like Dar, the north, and in the medias like the radio and the television. In many villages it is understood but not used. Amba- is followed by a suffix with the same agreements listed above.

Kiswahili ni lugha ambayo inaweza kusanya makabila Swahili is a language which can gather the tribes.
Mimi mtu ambaye anapenda utamaduni I'm a guy who likes traditional features.
Basi ambalo linachelewa sana The bus which is always late.

=== 'To be' ===
In most languages with a verbal copula, the equivalent of the verb 'to be', it is this verb that exhibits the most irregularity and the most diversity of form. Swahili is no exception. Outside of the present tense, the Swahili verb -wa (infinitive kuwa) is almost entirely regular, inflecting as other short verbs do. In the present tense, however, there is a distinction made between a copular of essence versus a copula of state or location. This is similar to the distinction between ser and estar in Spanish and Portuguese, however, in Swahili, this distinction largely vanishes outside of the present tense. There are also irregular relativised forms for the present tense as well as an irregular unique continuative form.

==== Essence ====
===== Invariable copula =====
The invariable copula ni is used, in the present tense, to express that two noun phrases (the subject and complement) refer to one and the same referent:

- Mimi ni Bahati. "I am Bahati."
- Dunia ni sayari tunapoishi. "Earth is the planet we live on."

It is also used to express membership of a class (a subset relationship):

- Wao ni wanasayansi. "They are scientists."
- Jua ni nyota. "The sun is a star."
- Miti ni mimea mikubwa. "Trees are large plants."

It may also introduce an adjective or equivalent phrase describing a relatively permanent characteristic.

- Babake ni mrefu sana. "Her father is very tall."
- Mji huyu ni mdogo. "This town is small."
- Misuli yako ni kama chuma. Your muscles are like steel.

The negative form si can be used in all the same situations with a negative meaning:

- Wewe si Bahati. "You are not Bahati."
- Jua si sayari. "The sun is not a planet."
- Pomboo si wadogo. "Dolphins are not small."

Because ni and si do not provide any information about the subject, personal pronouns, usually only necessary for emphasis, frequently appear. Compare the typical use of irregular present tense with that of the entirely regular past tense where the subject prefixes make personal pronouns redundant and used only for emphasis.

		Present		Past	
Number	Person	Positive	Negative	Positive	Negative
Singular	1st	mimi ni I am	mimi si I am not	nilikuwa I was	sikuwa I was not
Singular	2nd	wewe ni you are	wewe si you are not	ulikuwa you were	hukuwa you were not
Singular	3rd	yeye ni s/he is	yeye si s/he is not	alikuwa s/he was	hakuwa s/he was not
Plural	1st	sisi ni we are	sisi si we are not	tulikuwa we were	hatukuwa we were not
Plural	2nd	nyinyi ni you are	nyinyi si you are not	mlikuwa you were	hamkuwa you were not
Plural	3rd	wao ni they are	wao si they are not	walikuwa they were	hawakuwa they were not

A sentence begun with ni or si without an overtly marked pronoun is typically translated with the subject "it" in English. With plural context, "they" may be meant.

- Ni asubuhi sasa. "It's morning now."
- Ni vigumu kulala. "It's difficult to fall asleep."
- Ni wanene sana. "They're very fat."

On occasion, the invariable copula may follow regular forms of kuwa in other tenses. In the following example, the ni could also be left out.

kwa kweli huyo a-li-ku-w(a) ni kondoo w-a ku-kodi-iw(a)
INST true DEM.MED.CL1 CL1-PST-EXT-be COP sheep(CL9) CL1-GEN INF(CL15)-rent-PASS
by true {that, aforementioned} {s/he was} is sheep of {being rented}
"In truth, that was a rented sheep."

===== Emphatic copula =====
The emphatic or focusing copula ndi- places its subject in focus, emphasising that it is that particular referent and not another. The emphatic copula takes suffixes matching the person and noun class of the referent. These suffixes are the same as those which combine with na. In the first and second persons, the third person suffixes are frequently used.

Person / Class	Positive	Negative	Translation
1st sing.	ndimi, ndiye	simi, siye	"it is (not) I"
2nd sing.	ndiwe, ndiye	siwe, siye	"it is (not) you"
1st plur.	ndisi, ndio	sio, (sisi) (Note: The form sisi "it is not us" is not frequently used as it is identical to the pronoun sisi "we", "us". Instead it is virtually always replaced with sio.)	"it is (not) we"
2nd plur.	ndinyi, ndio	sinyi, sio	"it is (not) you"
1	ndiye	siye	"it is (not) s/he"
2	ndio	sio	"it is (not) they"
3	ndio	sio	"it is (not) it"
4	ndiyo	siyo	"it is (not) they"
5	ndilo	silo	"it is (not) it"
6	ndiyo	siyo	"it is (not) they"
7	ndicho	sicho	"it is (not) it"
8	ndivyo	sivyo	"it is (not) they", "it is (not) so"
9	ndiyo	siyo	"it is (not) it"
10	ndizo	sizo	"it is (not) they"
11	ndio	sio	"it is (not) it"
14	ndio	sio	"it is (not) it"
15	ndiko	siko	"it is (not) it"
16	ndipo	sipo	"it is (not) (t)here"
17	ndiko	siko	"it is (not) around (t)here"
18	ndimo	simo	"it is (not) in (t)here"

Forms of the emphatic copula are frequently equivalent to a definite phrase in translation and are followed by relative verb forms as in the following example:

mimi ndi-ye ni-li-ye-wa-on(a) kwanza
1S FOC.COP-CL1 1S-PST-REL.CL1-CL2-see first
I {am the one} {(I) who saw them} first
"I'm the one who saw them first."

Compare the above with the non-emphatic version of the same sentence:

ni-li-wa-on(a) kwanza
1S-PST-CL2-see first
{I saw them} first
"I saw them first."

==== Location ====
Location is indicated in the present tense by prefixing the subject concord to one of the locative clitics -po, -ko and -mo. The class 1 subject concord a- (negative: ha-) is however replaced with yu- (negative: hayu-).

The three clitics, -po, -ko and -mo correspond to the locative classes 16, 17 and 18 respectively and indicate "definite", "indefinite" and "internal" location respectively. For example, wapo means essentially "they are here/there", wako means "they are around here/there" and wamo means "they are in here/there".

	Positive			Negative		
Person / Class	Definite	Indefinite	Internal	Definite	Indefinite	Internal
1st sing.	nipo	niko	nimo	sipo	siko	simo
2nd sing.	upo	uko	umo	hupo	huko	humo
1st plur.	tupo	tuko	tumo	hatupo	hatuko	hatumo
2nd plur.	mpo	mko	mmo	hampo	hamko	hammo
1	yupo	yuko	yumo	hayupo	hayuko	hayumo
2	wapo	wako	wamo	hawapo	hawako	hawamo
3	upo	uko	umo	haupo	hauko	haumo
4	ipo	iko	imo	haipo	haiko	haimo
5	lipo	liko	limo	halipo	haliko	halimo
6	yapo	yako	yamo	hayapo	hayako	hayamo
7	kipo	kiko	kimo	hakipo	hakiko	hakimo
8	vipo	viko	vimo	havipo	haviko	havimo
9	ipo	iko	imo	haipo	haiko	haimo
10	zipo	ziko	zimo	hazipo	haziko	hazimo
11	upo	uko	umo	haupo	hauko	haumo
14	upo	uko	umo	haupo	hauko	haumo
15	kupo	kuko	kumo	hakupo	hakuko	hakumo
16	papo	pako	pamo	hapapo	hapako	hapamo
17	kupo	kuko	kumo	hakupo	hakuko	hakumo
18	mpo	mko	mmo	hampo	hamko	hammo

Under a very strict prescriptive viewpoint, the classes should not be mixed, for instance nipo hapa "I am here" is regarded as correct but niko hapa "I am here" is regarded as incorrect. There is, however, a broad tendency for many speakers to prefer forms with -ko over the other forms, such that niko hapa is very common.

==== State ====
Temporary states of being are frequently expressed as if they were locations, generally with the -ko clitic. In older forms of Swahili, this -ko was generally absent, with the subject prefix appearing as a standalone word for the copula. Nowadays, this short form is less usual although it is still frequently encountered in common phrases such as U hali gani? ('How are you?', literally 'You are in what condition?')

yu-(ko) tayari
CL1-(REF.CL17) ready
{She/he is} ready
"She is ready."

mbona u-(ko) kimya
why.EMPH CL2-(REF.CL17) silent
why {you are} silent
"Why are you silent."

Note that the standalone form of the 2nd person plural prefix m- is not *m but mu.

je mu wa-zima
Q 2P CL2-healthy
Question: {you are} healthy
"Are you well?"

je m-ko wa-zima
Q 2P-REF.CL17 CL2-healthy
Question: {you are} healthy
"Are you well?"

==== Relative forms ====
In the present tense, relative forms of the copula are formed with the subject prefix, the stem -li- in the positive and -si- in the negative, and the suffixed relative marker for the required noun class. In other tenses, relatives are formed regularly from the word kuwa.

Person / Class	Positive	Negative	Translation
1st sing.	niliye	nisiye	"(I) who is/am (not)"
2nd sing.	uliye	usiye	"(you) who is/are (not)"
1st plur.	tulio	tusio	"(we) who are (not)"
2nd plur.	mlio	msio	"(you) who are (not)"
1	aliye	asiye	"(he/she) who is (not)"
2	walio	wasio	"(they) who are (not)"
3	ulio	usio	"which is (not)"
4	iliyo	isiyo	"which are (not)"
5	lililo	lisilo	"which is (not)"
6	yaliyo	yasiyo	"which are/is (not)"
7	kilicho	kisicho	"which is (not)"
8	vilivyo	visivyo	"which are (not)"
9	iliyo	isiyo	"which is (not)"
10	zilizo	zisizo	"which are (not)"
11	ulio	usio	"which is (not)"
14	ulio	usio	"which is (not)"
15	kuliko	kusiko	"which is (not)"
16	palipo	pasipo	"which is (not)", "where there is/are (not)"
17	kuliko	kusiko	"which is (not)", "where there is/are (not)"
18	mlimo	msimo	"which is (not)", "where there is/are (not) in there"

daktari m-moja a-li-ye pia mwandishi
doctor(CL5) CL1-one CL1-COP.REL-REL.CL1 also writer(CL1)
doctor one {who is} also writer
"a doctor who is also a writer"

daktari wa-wili wa-li-o pia waandishi
doctor(CL5) CL2-two CL2-COP.REL-REL.CL2 also writers(CL2)
doctors two {who are} also writers
"two doctors who are also writers"

nyumba hizo zi-si-zo z-a kawaida
houses(CL10) DEM.CL10.MED CL10-NEG.COP.REL-REL.CL2 CL10-GEN norm(CL9)
houses {those aforementioned} {which are not} of norm
"those unusual houses", "those houses which are not usual"

The locative clitics -po, -ko and -mo may also be attached to the end of these words as needed.

watu w-ote wa-li-o-mo gereza-ni
people(CL2) CL2-all CL2-COP.REL-REL.CL2-REF.CL18 prison(CL5)-LOC(CL16/17/18)
people all {who are inside} {in prison}
"all the people who are in prison"

zi-li-zo-mo
CL10-COP.REL-REL.CL10-REF.CL18
{(things) which are inside}
"Table of Contents"

==== Continuative ====
The continuative is a special verb form unique to the verb "to be", meaning "is still", "are still" or "am still". It is formed by attaching the subject prefix to the suffix -ngali.

Person / Class	Positive	Translation
1st sing.	ningali	"I am still"
2nd sing.	ungali	"you are still"
1st plur.	tungali	"we are still"
2nd plur.	mngali	"you are still"
1	angali	"he/she is still"
2	wangali	"they are still"
3	ungali	"it is still"
4	ingali	"they are still"
5	lingali	"it is still"
6	yangali	"they are still"
7	kingali	"it is still"
8	vingali	"they are still"
9	ingali	"it is still"
10	zingali	"they are still"
11	ungali	"it is still"
14	ungali	"it is still"
15	kungali	"it [action] is still"
16	pangali	"it [place] is still"
17	kungali	"it [place] is still"
18	mngali	"it [place] is still"

ni-ngali shule-ni
1S-COP.CONT school(CL9)-LOC(CL16/17/18)
{I am still} {in school}
"I am still at school."

The continuous form of the copula is frequently used as in conjunction with other verbs both before and afterwards.

tu-li-ku-w(a) tu-ngali hatu-ja-on(a) simba
1P-PST-EXT-be 1P-COP.CONT NEG.1P-NEG.PRF-see lion
{we were} {we are still} {we haven't seen} lion
"We still hadn't seen a lion."

The locative clitics -po, -ko and -mo can be added to the end of the continuative forms.

konokono hao wa-ngali-po hadi leo
snails(CL10) DEM.CL2.MED CL2-COP.CONT-REF.CL16 until today
snails {those aforementioned} {they are still there} until today
"Those snails still exist to this day."

=== 'To have' ===
There is no dedicated verb meaning 'to have'. Its equivalent is kuwa na, literally 'to be with', using the comitative preposition na. In the present tense, however, kuwa na has special contractions, whereby the subject prefix is attached directly onto -na. Note that kuwa na has an existential meaning when the subject is in a locative class.

Person / Class	Positive	Negative	Translation
1st sing.	nina	sina	"I have" / "I don't have"
2nd sing.	una	huna	"you have" / "you don't have"
1st plur.	tuna	hatuna	"we have" / "we don't have"
2nd plur.	mna	hamna	"you have" / "you don't have"
1	ana	hana	"he/she has" / "he/she doesn't have"
2	wana	hawana	"they have" / "they don't have"
3	una	hauna	"it has" / "it doesn't have"
4	ina	haina	"they have" / "they don't have"
5	lina	halina	"it has" / "it doesn't have"
6	yana	hayana	"they have" / "they don't have"
7	kina	hakina	"it has" / "it doesn't have"
8	vina	havina	"they have" / "they don't have"
9	ina	haina	"it has" / "it doesn't have"
10	zina	hazina	"they have" / "they don't have"
11	una	hauna	"it has" / "it doesn't have"
14	una	hauna	"it has" / "it doesn't have"
15	kuna	hakuna	"it [action] has" / "it doesn't have"
16	pana	hapana	"there is/are (no) ... there"
17	kuna	hakuna	"there is/are (no)"
18	mna	hamna	""there is/are (no) ... in there"

tu-na tatizo kwa sababu si-na pesa
1P-COM problem(CL5) INST reason(CL9) NEG.1S-COM money(CL10)
{we have} problem with reason {} {}
"We have a problem because I don't have any money."

Kuwa na is declined regularly in every tense, mood and aspect other than the present. Note that it is then always written and pronounced with the na separate from the verb.

ni-si-po-ku-w(a) na pesa tu-ta-ku-w(a) na tatizo
1P-NEG.REL-REL.CL16-EXT-be COM money(CL10) 1P-FUT-EXT-be COM problem(CL5)
{if I am not} with money {we will be} with problem
"If I don't have any money, we will have a problem."

When the subject is one of the locative classes, kuwa na has an existential meaning, equivalent to "there is/are/was" etc. in English.

ku-na sababu y-a ku-hangaika
CL17-COM reason(CL9) CL9-GEN INF(CL15)-be.concerned
{the general area has} reason of {to be concerned}
"There is cause for concern."

hapa pa-na miti m-ingi
here(CL16) CL16-COM trees(CL4) CL4-many
{this specific place} {the specific place has} trees many
"There are a lot of trees here."

haku-na matata
NEG.CL17-COM trouble(CL6)
{the general area doesn't have} trouble/complications
"There are no troubles/complications."

* Note that this phrase, made famous by the movie The Lion King, was originally only used in certain areas and may now be regarded as a somewhat clichéd phrase used more by tourists than by Swahili speakers themselves. The following phrase is a more widely used equivalent.

ham-na shida
NEG.CL18-COM problem(CL9)
{the internal place doesn't have} problem
"There is no problem (in it/in here)."

When the object of kuwa na is pronominal, it is present as a referential suffix attached to na. The forms of this suffix are identical to the relative markers and are given outlined as combining forms here. Occasionally these may be used in conjunction with a following noun for special emphasis.

ni-na-cho
1S-COM-REF.CL7
{I have it}
"I have it [thing of class 7]."

wa-ta-ku-w(a) na-zo sababu ny-ingi z-a ku-baki
CL2-FUT-EXT-be COM-REF.CL10 reasons(CL10) CL10-many CL10-GEN INF(CL15)-stay
{they will be} {with them} reasons many of {to stay}
"They will have many reasons to stay."

When kuwa na forms a relative clause and the object is relativised, the relative suffix appears on the relative form of kuwa (or alternatively on the relative pronoun amba-) and the identical referential suffix appears on na-.

hizi ni pesa z-ote ni-li-zo na-zo
DEM.CL10.PROX COP money(CL10) CL10-all 1S-REL.COP-REL.CL10 COM-CL.10
these are money all {that I am} {with them}
"This is all the money (that) I have." (Note that pesa is plural in Swahili.)

=== Compound tenses ===
The verb kuwa "to be" may be used as an auxiliary verb in order to shift the temporal reference of other verb forms out of the present. Both the auxiliary and the main verb are finite verbs and this necessitates a repetition of the subject prefix, as can be seen from the examples below.

==== Anteriority ====
The equivalent of perfect tenses (other than present perfect) can be formed by a non-present form of kuwa followed by the present perfect -me- ("have done"), the perfect anterior -mesha- ("have already done") or the negative perfect -ja- ("have not (yet) done") verb forms.

ni-li-po-fik(a) wa-li-ku-w(a) wa-me-ku-l(a) chakula ch-ote
1S-PST-CL16.REL-arrive 3P.CL2-PST-EXT-be 3P.CL2-PRF-EXT-eat food(CL7) CL7-all
{when I arrived} {they were} {they have eaten} food all
"When I arrived, they had eaten all the food."

ku-fik(a)-i(a) wakati m-taka-po-fik(a)-i(a) umri w-angu huenda baadhi y-enu m-ta-ku-w(a) m-me-sha-za(a) watoto w-enu w-enyewe
INF.CL15-arrive-APPL time(CL11) 2P-FUT.REL-CL16.REL-arrive-APPL age(CL14) CL14-GEN.1S perhaps some(CL9) CL9-GEN.2P 2P-FUT-EXT-be 2P-PRF-ANT-bear children(CL2) CL2-GEN.2P CL2-self
{to arrive at} time {when you will arrive at} age my perhaps some {of you} {you will be} {you have already born} {children} {your} {(your)selves}
"By the time you are my age, some of you may have already had children of your own."

ni-li-po-fik(a) a-li-ku-w(a) hata ha-ja-va(a) viatu vy-ake
1S-PST-CL16.REL-arrive 3S.CL1-PST-EXT-be even NEG.3S.CL1-NEG.PRF-put.on shoes(CL8) CL8-his
{when I arrived} {he was} even {he has not put on} shoes his
"When I arrived, he hadn't even put his shoes on."

As in the previous example, it is usually the main verb that is negated. The auxiliary verb kuwa can be negated, however, in order to emphasise the negation, such as when contradicting an affirmative presupposition.

hapa-na bado ha-ku-w(a) a-me-va(a) viatu vy-ake
NEG.CL16-COM still NEG.3S.CL1-NEG.PST-be 3S.CL1-PRF-put.on shoes(CL8) CL8-GEN.3S
no still {he was not} {he has put on} shoes his
"No! He still hadn't put his shoes on!"

Compound tenses showing anteriority are frequently used with inchoative verbs in order to indicate static states at times other than the present.

si-ku-mw-omb(a) a-ni-saidi(a)-e kwa sababu wakati huo-huo a-li-ku-w(a) a-me-ni-kasirik(a)-i(a)
NEG.1S-NEG.PST-3S.CL1-request 3S.CL1-1S-help-SBJV for reason(CL9) time DEM.CL11.MED-REDUP 3S.CL1-PST-EXT-be 3S.CL1-PRF-1S-become.angry-APPL
{I didn't ask her} {she should help me} {for} {reason} {time} {that exact} {she was} {she has become angry with me}
"I didn't ask her to help me because, at that very moment, she was angry with me." (Literally: ... she had become angry with me.)

==== Simultaneity ====
Outside of the present tense, the equivalent of the continuous aspect can be formed by a non-present form of kuwa "to be" followed by either the situational verb form with -ki-, the present tense with -na- or its negative form with -i.

tu-li-po-fik(a) wa-li-ku-w(a) wa-ki-l(a) chakula ch-angu
1P-PST-CL16.REL-arrive 3P.CL2-PST-EXT-be 3P.CL2-SITU-eat food(CL7) CL7-all
{when we arrived} {they were} {(they) eating} food my
"When we arrived, they were eating my food."

tu-li-po-fik(a) wa-li-ku-w(a) wa-na-ku-l(a) chakula ch-angu
1P-PST-CL16.REL-arrive 3P.CL2-PST-EXT-be 3P.CL2-PRES-EXT-eat food(CL7) CL7-all
{when we arrived} {they were} {they are eating} food my
"When we arrived, they were eating my food."

ni-li-po-ku-angali(a) u-li-ku-w(a) hu-som(a)-i
1S-PST-CL16.REL-2S-look.at 2S-PST-EXT-be NEG.2S-read-NEG.PRES
{when I looked at you} {you were} {you are not reading}
"When I looked (at you), you were not reading."

u-si-ni-pig(a)-i(a)-e simu baada y-a saa tatu ni-ta-ku-w(a) ni-ki-fany(a) kazi
2S-NEG-1S-strike-APPL-SBJV phone(CL9) after(CL9) CL9-GEN saa(CL9) three 1S-FUT-EXT-be 1S-SITU-do kazi
{do not hit to me} phone after of hour three {I will be} {(I) doing} work
"Don't call me after 3 o'clock. I will be working."

wa-me-ku-w(a) wa-ki-jaribu ku-ni-zui(a) ni-si-ku-simuli(a)-e ya-li-yo-toke(a)
3P.CL2-PRF-EXT-be 3P.CL2-SITU-try INF(CL15)-1S-prevent 1S-NEG-2S-tell-SBJV CL6-PST-CL6.REL-happen
{they have been} {(they) trying} {to prevent me} {that I not tell you} {(things) that happened}
"They have been trying to stop me from telling you what happened."

As with the compound tenses of anteriority, negation applied to the auxiliary kuwa is frequently used to contradict affirmative presuppositions, as shown in the following examples.

ni-li-ku-w(a) si-mw-angali(a)-i a-li-po-anguk(a)
1S-PST-EXT-be NEG.1S-3S.CL1-look.at-NEG.PRES 3S.CL1-PST-CL16.REL-fall
{I was} {I do not look at him/her} {when she/he fell}
"I wasn't looking at him when he fell."

hapa-na si-ku-w(a) ni-ki-mw-angali(a) a-li-po-anguk(a)
NEG.CL16-COM NEG.1S-NEG.PST-be 1S-SITU-3S.CL1-look.at 3S.CL1-PST-CL16.REL-fall
no {I was not} {(I) looking at him/her} {when she/he fell}
"No, I wasn't looking at him when he fell."

These compound tenses with may also be used to talk about habitual actions at times other than the present, extending their meaning beyond that of a continuous or a progressive and towards that of an imperfective.

a-li-ku-w(a) a-ki-lew(a) mara ny-ingi sana
3S.CL1-PST-EXT-be 3S.CL1-SITU-get.intoxicated occasions(CL10) CL10-many very
{she/he was} {(she/he) getting intoxicated} times many very
"He used to get drunk very often."
Literally: "He was getting drunk very often."

=== Inchoative verbs ===
A large number of Swahili verbs indicate the process of entering a state. For example, the verbs kulewa ("to get drunk"), kuchoka ("to become tired") and kuchelewa ("to become late") describe the respective changes to state from "not drunk" to "drunk", from "not tired" to "tired" and from "not late" to "late". These may be regarded as inherently inchoative verbs. There is, however, no equivalent stative verb for each one that would describe being in the state of having completed that process, i.e. "to be [state]". Stative meanings such as "be drunk", "be tired" and "be late" are formed by using these inchoative verbs with the perfect marker -me- (or, in the negative, -ja-). Many words which are present in English as adjectives have no corresponding adjective in Swahili and are expressed by means of inchoative verbs.

Examples
Base verb	Inchoative	Stative
-fa	Anakufa. "He dies / is dying."	Amekufa. "He is dead." ( = "He has died.")
-choka	Ninachoka. "I become / am becoming tired."	Nimechoka. "I am tired." ( = "I have become tired.")
-vaa	Tunavaa viatu. "We put / are putting on shoes."	Tumevaa viatu. "We are wearing shoes." ( = "We have put on shoes.")
-kasirikia	Ananikasirikia. "He gets / is getting angry with me."	Amenikasirikia. "He is angry with me." (= "He has become angry with me.")
-jaa	Bafu inajaa. "The bath fills / is filling up."	Bafu imejaa. "The bath is full." (= "The bath has filled up.")
-funguliwa	Mlango unafunguliwa. "The door is (being) opened."	Mlango umefunguliwa. "The door is open." (= "The door has been opened.")
-iva	Chakula kinaiva. "The food cooks / is cooking."	Chakula kimeiva. "The food is cooked."
-simama	Wanasimama. "They get / stand / are getting up."	Wamesimama. "They are standing up / on their feet." (= "They have stood up.")
-keti	Anaketi. "She sits / is (in the process of) sitting down."	Ameketi. "She is sitting down / seated." (= "She has sat down.")

When using inchoative verbs, compound tenses must be used to talk about states occurring at times other than the present.

Base verb	Inchoative	Stative
-lala	Wanalala "They fall / are falling asleep."	Wamelala. "They are asleep / sleeping." ( = "They have fallen asleep.")
-lala	Walilala. "They fell asleep."	Walikuwa wamelala. "They were asleep / sleeping." ( = "They had fallen asleep.")
-lala	Watalala. "They will fall asleep."	Watakuwa wamelala. "They will be asleep / sleeping." ( = "They will have fallen asleep.")
-amka	Ninaamka "I wake / am waking up."	Nimeamka. "I am awake." ( = "I have woken up.")
-amka	Niliamka. "I woke up."	Nilikuwa nimeamka. "I was awake." ( = "I had woken up.")
-amka	Nitaamka. "I will wake up."	Nitakuwa nimeamka. "I will be awake." ( = "I will have woken up.")
-fa	Wanakufa "They die / are dying."	Wamekufa. "They are dead." ( = "They have died.")
-fa	Walikufa. "They died."	Walikuwa wamekufa. "They were dead." ( = "They had died.")
-fa	Watakufa. "They will die."	Watakuwa wamekufa. "They will be dead." ( = "They will have died.")

=== Derived verbs ===
New verbs are readily created from simple verbs by attaching various suffixes (often called extensions) to the stem to get different shades of meaning by altering grammatical voice. Note that the final -a of common and short verbs only appears at the very end of the verb and is dropped before any suffixes. All of these derivational suffixes, in turn, also contain the final -a, which is dropped when additional suffixes (both derivational and inflectional) are appended.

==== Reciprocal ====
The reciprocal suffix -ana adds the meaning "each other" to the verb.

- -penda "to love" → -pendana "to love each other"
- -andikia "to write to" → -andikiana "to write to each other"
- -pata "to get, receive" → -patana "to reconcile"
- -piga "to hit" → -pigana "to fight", "to hit each other"
- -tii "to obey" → -tiiana "to obey each other"

The subject of a reciprocal verb is generally plural, however a singular subject may be used, often followed by na and an additional referent.

wanaume wa-li-pig(a)-an(a) mitaa-ni
men(CL2) CL2-PST-hit-RECIP streets-LOC(CL16/17/18)
men {they fought each other} {on the streets}
"The men fought (each other) on the streets."

ni-li-po-ku-w(a) mvulana ni-li-pig(a)-an(a) na ye-y-ote a-li-ye-ni-kasirish(a)
1S-PST-CL16.REL-EXT-be boy(CL1) CL2-PST-hit-RECIP COM CL1.REL-CL1-ALL CL1-PST-CL1.REL-1S-make.angry
{when I was} {boy/young man} {I fought (each other)} with anyone {who made me angry}
"When I was a young man, I got in fights with anyone who made me angry."

==== Applicative ====
The applicative suffix, frequently called the 'prepositional extension' in learning resources, adds one of various meanings to a verb usually represented by a preposition in English such as "to", "for", "in", "with" or even "from". The form of the applicative suffix varies, depending on vowel harmony and the reappearance of the /l/ which disappeared from an older stage of Swahili between the final two vowels.

Applicative suffix on common verbs:
	Consonant-final root (Consonant + -a)	Vowel-final root (Vowel + -a)
Preceding syllable has /a/, /i/, /u/ or /m̩/	-ia	-lia
Preceding syllable has /e/ or /o/	-ea	-lea

- -andika "to write" → -andikia "to write to"
- -zungumza "to converse" → -zungumzia "to converse about", "to discuss"
- -nunua "to buy" → -nunulia "to buy for"
- -soma "to read" → -somea "to read to/for"
- -kojoa "to urinate" → -kojolea "to urinate on/in/against"

Loan verbs usually form their applicative forms by removing their final vowel and replacing it with either -ia or -ea according to the same rules.

- -rudi "to return" → -rudia "to return to"
- -samehe "to forgive" → -samehea "to forgive (sb.) for (sb.)"
- -hesabu "to count", "to consider" → -hesabia "to count for", "to ascribe"

==== Causative ====
The causative suffix is added to verbs to indicate a person or thing causing another person or thing to perform the action of the original verb. There are a few ways in which causatives are formed. The most common and productive causative suffix is -isha, which follows the same rules of vowel harmony as the applicative suffix.

Causative suffix on common verbs:
	Consonant-final root (Consonant + -a)	Vowel-final root (Vowel + -a)
Preceding syllable has /a/, /i/, /u/ or /m̩/	-isha	-lisha
Preceding syllable has /e/ or /o/	-esha	-lesha

- -hama "to move (away)" → -hamisha "to banish; transfer; displace"
- -chelewa "to be late" → -chelewesha "to delay; make late"
- -soma "to read; study" → -somesha "to teach"
- -kopa "to borrow" → -kopesha "to lend"
- -weza "to be able" → -wezesha "to enable"
- -enda "to go" → -endesha "to make go; drive (a vehicle)"
- -vaa "to put on (clothes); dress (oneself)" → -valisha "to dress (somebody else)"
- -ongea "to speak" → -ongelesha "to make speak"

Short verbs have no preceding vowel so have to be learnt individually.

- -fa "to die" → -fisha "to put to death; kill; destroy"; cf. the underived verb -ua "to kill"
- -la "to eat" → -lisha "to feed (someone/something)"
- -nywa "to drink" → -nywesha "to give (someone/something) water to drink"

Loan verbs, except those ending in -au, remove their final vowel before adding these suffixes.

- -fahamu "to understand" → -fahamisha "to make understand"
- -rudi "to return; go back; come back" → -rudisha "to return (something); give back; bring back"
- -tii "to obey" → -tiisha "to make obey; subdue; dominate; subjugate"
- -furahi "to become happy" → -furahisha "to make happy; gladden"
- -starehe "to relax" → -starehesha "to entertain; put at ease"
- -sahau "to forget" → -sahaulisha "to make forget"

These suffixes may also be added to adjectives and nouns to create causative verbs from them.

- imara "strong" (adjective) → -imarisha "to strengthen (something); fortify"
- -fupi "short" (adjective) → -fupisha "to shorten (something)"
- tayari "ready" (adjective) → -tayarisha "to prepare (something); to make ready"
- bora "better" (adjective) → -boresha "to improve (something); to make better"
- safi "clean" (adjective) → -safisha "to clean (something)"
- sababu "cause; reason" (noun) → -sababisha "to cause"
- lazima "obligation" (noun) → -lazimisha "to force; compel"
- orodha "list" (noun) → -orodhesha "to list; to make a list"
- huzuni "sadness" (noun) → -huzunisha "to make sad; sadden"
- hakika "certainty" (noun) → -hakikisha "to make sure; make certain; assure"

There is a less common causative suffix -iza or -eza which appears with some words. Often there is more than one derivation from the same word, sometimes with different meanings.

- -penda "to like; love" → -pendeza "to please; be nice; be attractive"; cf. -pendesha "to cause to like/love"
- -lipa "to pay" → -lipiza "to take vengeance/revenge on; to make (somebody) pay (figuratively)"; cf. -lipisha "to charge a fee; to make (somebody) pay (literally)"

There is another means of deriving causative verbs and which results from an earlier -y- in the language. This -y- suffix combined with consonants and changed their pronunciation, palatalising or "softening" them. The following table outlines the common sound changes.

consonant	becomes:
-t-	-sh-
-k-	-sh-
-l-	-z-
-n-	-ny-
-p-	-fy-
-w-	-vy-

In many cases, more than one of these suffixes may be used to derive different verbs from a single verb, formed by various means. In some cases, such as with -onyesha "to show", two causative suffixes may appear together.

- -ona "to see" → -onya "to warn"; cf. -onyesha "to show" (also: -onesha)
- -ogopa "to fear; be afraid/scared of" → -ogofya "to frighten; to be scary"; cf. -ogopesha "to frighten; to be scary" (no difference in meaning)
- -pona "to heal; to get better; to recover" (intransitive) → -ponya "to heal (somebody); to make recover"; cf. -ponyesha "to heal (somebody); to make recover" (no difference in meaning)
- -pita "to pass" → -pisha "to give way; make room for; allow to pass"; cf. -pitisha "to make pass"
- -lala "to lie down; fall asleep" → -laza "to house; provide with accommodation; lay sb. down; admit (somebody to hospital)"; cf. -lalisha "to put (somebody) to bed"
- -lewa "to get drunk/inebriated" → -levya "to intoxicate" (of a drug); cf. -lewesha "to get (somebody) drunk"

Verbs that end with -ka very frequently exchange this to -sha to form the causative, however this is much less common when the preceding syllable contains e or i.

- -amka "to wake up" (oneself) → -amsha "to wake (somebody) up"
- -chemka "to boil" (intransitive) → -chemsha "to boil (something); to make boil" (the m in this word is syllabic, derived from earlier "-mu-", so the e does not belong to the preceding syllable)
- -waka "to shine, to catch fire" → -washa "to set on fire; light; switch on; start (e.g. a car)"
- -choka "to become tired" → -chosha "to tire; be tiring; be tiresome; be boring"
- -kumbuka "to remember" → -kumbusha "to remind"
- -andika "to write" → -andikisha "to make write"
- -cheka "to laugh" → -chekesha "to make laugh; amuse; be funny"

Because most of the word-final sequences of more than one vowel come from the deletion of an l that was present in an earlier stage of the language (and often preserved in many dialects and related languages), many verbs which today end in a sequence of two vowels are made by (removing the final -a) and adding -za. This -z- results from the palatalisation ("softening") process outlined above. which was applied to the -l- in these verbs. The -l- was subsequently lost but the -z- was not.

- -tangaa "to become widely known" → -tangaza "to announce; proclaim; publicise"
- -kataa "to refuse" → -kataza "to forbid"; cf. -katalisha "to make (somebody) refuse"
- -tembea "to (go for a) walk" → -tembeza "to take for a walk; to walk (e.g. a dog)"
- -kimbia "to run (away from)" → -kimbiza "to chase (away); pursue"
- -jaa "to fill; become full" → -jaza "to fill; make full"

==== Passive ====
The passive suffix is generally -wa.

- -jenga "to build" (whence Jenga) → -jengwa "to be built"
- -sema "to say" → -semwa "to be said"
- -danganya "to deceive" → -danganywa "to be deceived"

Verb stems that end with l or either of the semivowels w or y (but not ny as that is a single consonant written with two letters, as illustrated by -danganywa above) take a suffix -iwa; if the preceding syllable contains e or o, it will be -ewa instead.

- -pwaya "to pound" → -pwayiwa "to be pounded"
- -chovya "to immerse" → -chovyewa "to be immersed"
- -doya "to investigate" → -doyewa "to be investigated"
- -gawa "to share; divide" → -gawiwa "to be shared; be divided"
- -tawala "to govern; rule" → -tawaliwa "to be governed; be ruled"

Verbs whose ending in one of the front vowels plus a, (i.e. the sequences -ea and -ia) usually simply add -wa.

- -ambia "to tell (someone)" → -ambiwa "to be told" (of someone)
- -tegemea "to rely on" → -tegemewa "to be relied on"
- -zuia "to prevent" → -zuiwa "to be prevented"

A few words of this group, however, add -lewa (after an e) or -liwa (after i).

- -tia "to put in" → -tiliwa "to be put in"
- -lea "to bring up; raise" → -lelewa "to be brought up, raised"
- -pokea "to receive" → -pokewa / -pokelewa "to be received" (both alternatives possible)

As Swahili does not distinguish between the sequences /ua/ and /uwa/ or /oa/ and /owa/, the passive ending -wa would be inaudible after /o/ or /u/, so the -liwa and -lewa endings are used here instead.

- -oa "to get married" (of a man) → -olewa "to get married" (of a woman)
- -toa "to emit; publish; add; subtract; remove" → -tolewa "to be emitted; be published; be added; be subtracted; removed" (These verbs are auto-antonyms!)
- -nunua "to buy" → -nunuliwa "to be bought"

Note that the verb -ua "to kill" has an irregular passive form: -uawa, although the regular -uliwa is occasionally used.

The Kiunguja dialect, specifically the variant of it spoken in Zanzibar City, which has been made the standard dialect, goes a step further than many other dialects, requiring also that all verbs ending in -aa be passivised with the suffix -liwa even though the difference between /ɑɑ/ and /ɑwɑ/ is perfectly distinct.

- -zaa "to give birth to; sire" → -zaliwa "to be born" (dialectically also -zawa)
- -vaa "to put on (clothing)" → -valiwa "to be put on"
- -kaa "to sit; stay; reside" → -kaliwa "to be inhabited; be occupied; be settled; be sat upon; be stayed in"

The short verbs have passive forms that must be learnt separately. In each case, the passive form is one syllable longer and falls into the category of common verbs and thus does not receive the extension -ku- anywhere in its conjugation.

- -la "to eat" → -liwa "to be eaten"
- -nywa "to drink" → -nywewa "to be drunk"
- -pa "to give to" → -pewa "to be given; to receive"
- -nya "to shit; drop (rain)" → -nyewa "to be shat; be dropped"
- -cha "to fear; revere" → -chiwa "to be feared; revered"

Most loan-verbs simply add -wa.

- -hitaji "to need" → -hitajiwa "to be needed"
- -kodi "to rent; hire" → -kodiwa "to be rented; be hired"
- -samehe "to forgive" → -samehewa "to be forgiven"
- -dai "to claim" → -daiwa "to be claimed"

If a loan-verb ends with a consonant followed by -u, this u becomes an i

- -laumu "to blame" → -laumiwa "to be blamed"
- -jaribu "to try" → -jaribiwa "to be tried"

Loan-verbs which end in -au add -liwa

- -sahau "to forget" → -sahauliwa "to be forgotten"

Verbs ending in -uu lose one u and replace it with -liwa.

- -nukuu "to copy; transcribe; transliterate" → -nuku-liwa "to be copied; be transcribed; be transliterated"

The agent in a sentence with a passive verb does not need to be included in the sentence. The passive verb, however, does explicitly allude to the existence of an agent, in contrast to the mediopassive below. When the agent is included in the sentence, it is introduced by the preposition na, which is here the equivalent of the English "by", although in other contexts it is more usually equivalent to "and" or "with".

==== Mediopassive ====
The mediopassive suffix is added to a transitive verb in order to promote its object to the role of subject without the implication of an agent. The form of the suffix involved ends in -ka and generally the harmonic i or e before it, although this may be dropped in verbs with a vowel final root; alternatively, the lost l of final vowel combinations may reappear and act as a buffer for the harmonic i or e.

Mediopassive suffix on common verbs
	Consonant-final root (Consonant + -a)	Vowel-final root (Vowel + -a)
Preceding syllable has /a/, /i/, /u/ or /m̩/	-ika	-ka, -lika
Preceding syllable has /e/ or /o/	-eka	-ka, -leka

- -vunja "to break (something)" → -vunjika "to break" (intransitive)
- -pika "to cook (something)" → -pikika "to cook" (intransitive)
- -elewa "to understand (something)" → -eleweka "to be understood"
- -sikia "to hear" → -sikika "to be heard; be audible"
- -kaa "to sit; stay; inhabit" → -kalika "to be inhabited; be inhabitable"
- -zoea "to get used to; grow accustomed to" → -zoelika "to become customary"

As with the other derivational suffixes (or "extensions"), loan verbs generally lose their final vowel before adding -ika or -eka according to vowel harmony rules. The exceptions are those ending in -au which use -lika.

- -haribu "to spoil (something); ruin; destroy" → -haribika "to spoil; get spoiled; get ruined; get destroyed"
- -sahau "to forget" → -sahaulika "to become forgotten"
- -kebehi "to ridicule; make fun of" → -kebehika "to get ridiculed; get made fun of"

In learner materials, the mediopassive suffix generally erroneously described as the "stative extension" despite the fact that the resulting verbs do not generally fulfil the requirements stative: namely that they describe unchanging states. For example, the mediopassive verb -vunjika "to break; go to pieces" contrasts with its source verb -vunja "to break; make go to pieces", not in the quality of being either stative or dynamic — both are dynamic, describing a process that changes over time — but in that the subject of -vunjika is equivalent to the object of -vunja, and the subject of -vunja is completely absent from a clause with -vunjika. In this respect, mediopassive verbs are the same as passive verbs, however they are distinguished by their incompatibility with any mention of an agent. Compare the following three examples.

Active transitive verb (dynamic)

Juma a-li-vunj(a) dirisha
{[male name]} CL1-PST-break(TR) (CL5)window
Juma {s/he broke} window
"Juma broke the window."

Passive transitive verb (dynamic)

dirisha li-li-vunj(a)-w(a) {(na Juma)}
(CL5)window CL5-PST-break(TR)-PASS {(COM [male name])}
window {it was broken} {(by Juma)}
"The window was broken (by Juma)."

Mediopassive verb (dynamic)

dirisha li-li-vunj(a)-ik(a)
(CL5)window CL5-PST-break(TR)-MP
window {it broke}
"The window broke."

Mediopassive verbs often have the appearance of being stative when used in the perfect. However, this is a function of the perfect, which focuses on the present relevance of a past action, rather than a function of the mediopassive itself. For example, the sentence "Dirisha limevunjika" means either "The window has broken," or "The window is broken." What is being said is that the window broke in the past, but that the effects of this action are still relevant in the present. The verb itself, -vunjika, does not describe the state of being broken, but rather the dynamic process of changing from "whole; intact" to "broken; in pieces". The perfect -me- here indicates that one is concerned with the state after the dynamic process.

==== Reversive ====
The reversive form of a verb indicates a reversal of the action of the original verb. The reversive suffix is no longer productive in modern Swahili, but still exists in a number of verbs that are now lexicalized. The suffix takes the form -u- or, after a syllable containing o, -o- before the final -a.

Examples:

- ‑funga "to close/shut" → ‑fungua "to open" (e.g. a door)
- ‑fumba "to close/shut" → ‑fumbua "to open" (e.g. eyes)
- ‑panga "to arrange" → ‑pangua "to disarrange"
- ‑jenga "to build" → ‑jengua "to tear down"
- ‑shona "to sew" → ‑shonoa "to unsew, remove stitches"

Rashid a-me-fung(a) mlango
{[male name]} CL1-PRF-close (CL3)door
Rashid {s/he has closed} door

Rashid a-me-fung-u(a) mlango
{[male name]} CL1-PRF-open-REV (CL3)door
Rashid {s/he has opened} door

==== Suffix stacking ====
Suffixes can be stacked upon each other to make quite long verb stems with specific meanings. The passive suffix must always be last in Swahili.

- -andika "to write"
  → -andikwa "to be written"
- -andika "to write"
  → -andikisha "to cause to write"
  → -andikishwa "to be caused to write"
- -andika "to write"
  → -andikia "to write to"
  → -andikiwa "to be written to"
- -andika "to write"
  → -andikia "to write to"
  → -andikiana "to write to each other"
  → -andikianisha "to cause to write to each other"
  → -andikianishwa "to be caused to write to each other"

Here is another rather more implausible example:

- -la "to eat"
  → -lika "to be edible"
  → -likia "to be edible to"
  → -likiana "to be edible to each other"
  → -likianisha "to cause to be edible to each other"
  → -likianishwa "to be caused to be edible to each other"

== Prepositions ==
=== Comitative na ===
In addition to functioning as a conjunction meaning "and", na is also a very common preposition meaning:

1. "With" in a comitative sense ("together with", "along with", "accompanied by"), often occurring after reciprocal verbs ending in -ana. Njoo nami. "Come with me." Yuko pale pamoja na rafiki zake. "She is there with her friends." Dada yako anafanana na mama yenu. "Your sister looks like your mother.
2. "With" in an ornative sense ("having") when appearing with the verb kuwa "to be" to form kuwa na "to have". Nina pesa zako. "I have your money." Kusingekuwa na mbu. "There wouldn't be any mosquitos." (See: 'to have')
3. "By" when introducing the agent in a passive sentence. Alipendwa sana na kila mtu kijijini. "He was loved by everyone in the village."

Shortened forms of pronouns are frequently suffixed to na, both when na is used as a preposition.

Person / Class		Short	Full form	Translation
1st sing.		nami	na mimi	"with me", "by me", "and I"
2nd sing.		nawe	na wewe	"with you", "by you", "and you"
1st plur.		nasi	na sisi	"with us", "by us", "and we"
2nd plur.		nanyi	na ninyi	"with you", "by you", "and you"
1	m-	naye	na yeye	"with him/her", "by her/him", "and she/he"
2	wa-	nao	na wao	"with them", "by them", "and they"
3	m-	nao	na huo	"with it", "by it", "and it"
4	mi-	nayo	na hiyo	"with them", "by them", "and they"
5	ji-	nalo	na hilo	"with it", "by it", "and it"
6	ma-	nayo	na hayo	"with them", "by them", "and they"
7	ki-	nacho	na hicho	"with it", "by it", "and it"
8	vi-	navyo	na hivyo	"with them", "by them", "and they"
9	N-	nayo	na hiyo	"with it", "by it", "and it"
10	N-	nazo	na hizo	"with them", "by them", "and they"
11	u-	nao	na huo	"with it", "by it", "and it"
14	u-	nao	na huo	"with it", "by it", "and it"
15	ku-	nako	na huko	"with it", "by it", "and it" [action]
16	-ni/pa-	napo	na hapo	"with it", "by it", "and it" [place]
17	-ni/ku-	nako	na huko	"with it", "by it", "and it" [place]
18	-ni/m-	namu	na humu	"with it", "by it", "and it" [place]

=== Genitive -a ===
The genitive preposition -a (sometimes termed a "connector", "possessive" or "associative" preposition) has a similar role to that of the genitive case of some other languages. It indicates the possessor, or a more general association, and roughly corresponds in meaning to the English preposition "of". It receives a prefix that agrees with the preceding noun's class. For example:

- kitabu cha mwanafunzi "the student's book" ("book of student")
- vitabu vya mwanafunzi "the student's books" ("books of student")

The equivalent of English compound nouns are often formed with genitive constructions, such as taa ya barabarani "traffic light", "street light", which is literally equivalent to "light of road-LOC".

The personal pronouns each have their own genitive stem, as outlined in the section on personal pronouns, for example:

- kitabu chake "his/her book"

The genitive preposition is formed from the subject concord of verbs (which you can see here), plus -a. There are some sound changes that happen. U- and i- become their equivalent semivowels w- and y- respectively. After consonants, this y is generally dropped although ki- and vi- become ch- and vy-. The class 1 verbal concord a- is an exception, being replaced with w- in the genitive construction.

Class		Verbal subject concord	Genitive preposition	Rule
1	m-	a- / yu-	wa	exception
2	wa-	wa-	wa	wa+a → a deleted
3	m-	u-	wa	u+a → u becomes w
4	mi-	i-	ya	i+a → i becomes y
5	ji-	li-	la	li+a → i deleted
6	ma-	ya-	ya	ya+a → a deleted
7	ki-	ki-	cha	ki+a → ki becomes ch
8	vi-	vi-	vya	vi+a → i becomes y
9	N-	i-	ya	i+a → i becomes y
10	N-	zi-	za	zi+a → i deleted
11	u-	u-	wa	u+a → u becomes w
14	u-	u-	wa	u+a → u becomes w
15	ku-	ku-	kwa	ku+a → u becomes w
16	-ni/pa-	pa-	pa	pa+a → a deleted
17	-ni/ku-	ku-	kwa	ku+a → u becomes w
18	-ni/m-	mu-	mwa	mu+a → u becomes w

==== kwa ====
The word kwa is a very frequently encountered preposition in Swahili. It may be regarded as either the class 15 or class 17 variant of -a. Where there is no 15 or class 17 antecedent, its function is adverbial, relating to the action expressed by the sentence rather than to a particular noun within it. It may be equivalent to a wide variety of prepositions in English, but it possibly frequently equivalent to an instrumental use of "by (means of)", "using" or "with". In standard Swahili, it may indicate a location associated with an animate referent, but is replaced by kwenye for inanimate referents.

- Tulikuja kwa miguu. "We came on foot." (Literally: "We came by feet.")
- Alirudi kwa Rehema. "She returned to Rehema's (place)."

=== Ornative -enye ===
The ornative preposition -enye essentially means "having" or "with" and takes the same prefixes as the genitive -a with the exception of class 1, where it receives the prefix mw- instead of w-. The word -enye is followed by a noun.

Class		noun	ornative	noun	translation	literal translation
1	mw-	mwanaume	mwenye	nguvu	a strong man	man having strength
2	wa-	wanaume	wenye	nguvu	strong men	men having strength
3	m-	mto	wenye	mamba	a crocodile-infested river	river having crocodiles
4	mi-	mito	yenye	mamba	crocodile-infested rivers	rivers having crocodiles
5	ji-	gari	lenye	magurudumu matatu	a three-wheeled car	car having three wheels
6	ma-	magari	yenye	magurudumu matatu	three-wheeled cars	cars having three wheels
7	ki-	kisiwa	chenye	wakazi	an inhabited island	an island having inhabitants
8	vi-	visiwa	vyenye	wakazi	inhabited islands	islands having inhabitants
9	N-	nyumba	yenye	chumba kimoja	a one-room house	house having one room
10	N-	nyumba	zenye	chumba kimoja	one-room houses	houses having one room
11	u-	uso	wenye	tabasamu	a smiling face	face having smile
14	u-	upendo	wenye	kina	deep love	love having depth
15	ku-		kwenye			
16	-ni/pa-	mahali	penye	giza	(in/to/from) a dark place	place having darkness
17	-ni/ku-		kwenye			
18	-ni/m-		mwenye			

-Enye may be used pronominally without a preceding noun to which it relates. This is particularly common in proverbs, such as the following.

mw-enye choyo ha-shib-i
CL1-ORN greed(CL9) NEG.3S.CL1-be.sated-NEG.PRES
{(person) having} greed {s/he is not sated}
"A greedy person is never satisfied."

p-enye nia pa-na njia
CL16-ORN intention/purpose(CL9) CL16-COM way(CL9)
{(place) having} intention/purpose {it has / there is} way
"Where there's a will, there's a way."

==== kwenye ====
The word kwenye is a very frequently encountered preposition in Swahili. It is the class 15 or class 17 variant of -enye. Where there is no 15 or class 17 antecedent, its function is adverbial, relating to the action expressed by the sentence rather than to a particular noun within it. It may be equivalent to a wide variety of prepositions in English, but it is generally equivalent to locative prepositions such as "to", "into", "on", "in", "at" or "from". It is frequently exactly equivalent to the use of the locative classes, indicated with the suffix -ni. As with the locative classes, whether kwenye indicates a destination ("to", "into"), a location ("on", "in", "at") or an origin ("from") depends on the verb used in the sentence. In the following examples, which of kwenye soko and sokoni is used is largely a matter of personal choice and speaking style.

- Twende kwenye soko. / Twende sokoni. "Let's go to the market."
- Niko kwenye soko. / Niko sokoni. "I'm at the market."
- Wameondoka kwenye soko. / Wameondoka sokoni. "They have left the market."

Kwenye is frequently used with nouns in order to avoid placing them in the locative classes, such as when they are modified by adjective phrases or -a. For example, both kwenye soko and the locative form sokoni can be used to mean "(to/in/from) the/a market", however if soko is modified by an adjective, such as soko kubwa ("big market") or a phrase with -a or -enye, such as soko la mboga ("vegetable market"), or both, such as soko kubwa la mboga ("big vegetable market"), using the derived locative noun sokoni would prevent the modifiers from being able to inflect in class 5 (kubwa la mboga) and force concord with one of the locative classes. In most cases, particularly with adjectives, this is no longer usual in modern Swahili. The following example is correct according to the theoretical constructs of Swahili grammar, yet unidiomatic in modern Swahili.

? tu-end(a)-e soko-ni ku-kubwa kw-a mboga
? 1P-go-SBJV market(CL5)-LOC(CL16/17/18) CL17-large CL17-GEN vegetable(s)(CL9,10)
? {let's go} {to market} large of vegetable(s)
? "Let's go to the big vegetable market."

Thus, in many cases, kwenye is preferred over the locative -ni as it allows a complex noun-phrase to retain its usual noun class and concords, as in the following example.

tu-end(a)-e kw-enye soko Ø-kubwa l-a mboga
1P-go-SBJV CL17-ORN market(CL5) CL5-large CL5-GEN vegetable(s)(CL9,10)
{let's go} to market large of vegetable(s)
"Let's go to the big vegetable market."
