= Conditional sentence =

Sentence expressing an 'if-then' relation

A conditional sentence is a sentence in a natural language that expresses that one thing is contingent on another, e.g., "If it rains, the picnic will be cancelled." They are so called because the impact of the sentence’s main clause is conditional on a subordinate clause. A full conditional thus contains two clauses: the subordinate clause, called the antecedent (or protasis or if-clause), which expresses the condition, and the main clause, called the consequent (or apodosis or then-clause) expressing the result.

To form conditional sentences, languages use a variety of grammatical forms and constructions. The forms of verbs used in the antecedent and consequent are often subject to particular rules as regards their tense, aspect, and mood. Many languages have a specialized type of verb form called the conditional mood – broadly equivalent in meaning to the English "would (do something)" – for use in some types of conditional sentences.

== Types of conditional sentence ==
There are various ways of classifying conditional sentences. Many of these categories are visible cross-linguistically.

=== Implicative and predictive ===
A conditional sentence expressing an implication (also called a factual conditional sentence) essentially states that if one fact holds, then so does another. (If the sentence is not a declarative sentence, then the consequence may be expressed as an order or a question rather than a statement.) The facts are usually stated in whatever grammatical tense is appropriate to them; there are no normally special tense or mood patterns for this type of conditional sentence. Such sentences may be used to express a certainty, a universal statement, a law of science, etc. (in these cases if may often be replaced by when):

If you heat water to 100 degrees Celsius (°C), it boils.
If the sea is stormy, the waves are high.

They can also be used for logical deductions about particular circumstances (which can be in various mixtures of past, present, and future):

If it's raining here now, then it was raining on the West Coast this morning.
If it's raining now, then your laundry is getting wet.
If it's raining now, there will be mushrooms to be picked next week.
If he locked the door, then Kitty is trapped inside.

A predictive conditional sentence concerns a situation dependent on a hypothetical (but entirely possible) future event. The consequence is normally also a statement about the future, although it may also be a consequent statement about present or past time (or a question or order).

If I become President, I'll lower taxes.
If it rains this afternoon, everybody will stay home.
If it rains this afternoon, then yesterday's weather forecast was wrong.
If it rains this afternoon, your garden party is doomed.
What will you do if he invites you?
If you see them, shoot!

=== Indicative and counterfactual ===
One of the most discussed distinctions among conditionals is that between indicative and counterfactual conditionals, exemplified by the following English examples:

- Indicative conditional: If Sally owns a donkey, then she beats it.
- Simple past counterfactual: If Sally owned a donkey, she would beat it.

These conditionals differ in both form and meaning. The indicative conditional uses the present tense forms "owns" and "beats" and therefore conveys that the speaker is agnostic about whether Sally in fact owns a donkey. The counterfactual example uses the fake tense form "owned" in the "if" clause and the past-inflected modal "would" in the "then" clause. As a result, it conveys that Sally does not in fact own a donkey. Similar contrasts are common crosslinguistically, though the specific morphological marking varies from language to language.

Linguists and philosophers of language sometimes avoid the term counterfactuals because not all examples express counterfactual meanings. For instance, the "Anderson Case" has the characteristic grammatical form of a counterfactual conditional, but is in fact used as part of an argument for the truth of its antecedent.

Anderson Case: If Jones had taken arsenic, he would have shown just exactly those symptoms which he does in fact show.

The term subjunctive conditional has been used as a replacement, though it is also acknowledged as a misnomer. Many languages do not have a subjunctive (e.g., Danish and Dutch), and many that do have it don’t use it for this sort of conditional (e.g., French, Swahili, all Indo-Aryan languages that have a subjunctive). Moreover, languages that do use the subjunctive for such conditionals only do so if they have a specific past subjunctive form. The term X-Marked has been used as a replacement, with indicative conditionals renamed as O-Marked conditionals.

=== Speech act conditionals ===
Biscuit conditionals (also known as relevance or speech act conditionals) are conditionals where the truth of the consequent does not depend on the truth of the antecedent.

- There are biscuits on the table if you want some.
- If you need anything, my name is Joshua.
- If I may be honest, you're not looking good

In metalinguistic conditionals, the antecedent qualifies the usage of some term. For instance, in the following example, the speaker has unconditionally asserted that they saw the relevant person, whether or not that person should really be called their ex-husband.

- I saw my ex-husband, if that's the right word for him.

=== Non-declarative conditionals ===
In conditional questions, the antecedent qualifies a question asked in the consequent.

- If Mary comes to the party, will Katherine come too?
- If Angel forgets her guitar, what will we do?

In conditional imperatives, the antecedent qualifies a command given in the consequent.

- If you are at an intersection, turn right!

== Crosslinguistic variation ==
Languages have different rules concerning the grammatical structure of conditional sentences. These may concern the syntactic structure of the antecedent and consequent clauses, as well as the forms of verbs used in them (particularly their tense and mood). Rules for English and certain other languages are described below; more information can be found in the articles on the grammars of individual languages. (Some languages are also described in the article on the conditional mood.)

=== Latin ===
Conditional sentences in Latin are traditionally classified into three categories, based on grammatical structure.

- simple conditions (factual or logical implications)
  - present tense [if present indicative then indicative]

sī valēs, gaudeo "if you are well, I am glad"

- past tense [if perfect indicative then indicative]

sī peccāvī, īnsciēns fēcī "if I did wrong, I did so unwittingly"

- 2nd person generalisations [if present or perfect subjunctive then indicative]

memoria minuitur, nisi eam exerceās "memory gets weaker, if you don't exercise it"

- future conditions
  - "future more vivid" [if future or future perfect indicative then future indicative]

haec sī attulerīs, cēnābis bene "if you bring (literally "will have brought") these things, you will dine well"

- "future less vivid" [if present or perfect subjunctive then present subjunctive]

sī negem, mentiar "if I were to deny it, I would be lying"

- counterfactual conditions
  - "present contrary-to-fact" [if imperfect subjunctive then imperfect subjunctive]

scrīberem plūra, sī Rōmae essēs "I would write more, if you were in Rome"

- "past contrary-to-fact" [if pluperfect subjunctive then pluperfect subjunctive]

sī Rōmae fuissem, tē vīdissem "if I had been in Rome, I would have seen you"

=== French ===
In French, the conjunction corresponding to "if" is si. The use of tenses is quite similar to English:

- In implicative conditional sentences, the present tense (or other appropriate tense, mood, etc.) is used in both clauses.
- In predictive conditional sentences, the future tense or imperative generally appears in the main clause, but the condition clause is formed with the present tense (as in English). This contrasts with subordinate clauses introduced by certain other conjunctions, such as quand ("when"), where French uses the future (while English has the present).
- In counterfactual conditional sentences, the imperfect is used to express the condition (where English similarly uses the past tense). The main clause contains the conditional mood (e.g. j'arriverais, "I would arrive").
- In counterfactual conditional sentences with a past time frame, the condition is expressed using the pluperfect e.g. (s'il avait attendu, "if he had waited"), and the consequence with the conditional perfect (e.g. je l'aurais vu, "I would have seen him"). Again these verb forms parallel those used in English.

As in English, certain mixtures and variations of these patterns are possible. See also French verbs.

=== Italian ===
Italian uses the following patterns (the equivalent of "if" is se):

- Present tense (or other as appropriate) in both parts of an implicative conditional.
- Future tense in both parts of a predictive conditional sentence (the future is not replaced with the present in condition clauses as in English or French).
- In a counterfactual conditional, the imperfect subjunctive is used for the condition, and the conditional mood for the main clause. A more informal equivalent is to use the imperfect indicative in both parts.
- In a counterfactual conditional with past time frame, the pluperfect subjunctive is used for the condition, and the past conditional (conditional perfect) for the main clause.

See also Italian verbs.

=== Slavic languages ===
In Slavic languages, such as Russian, clauses in conditional sentences generally appear in their natural tense (future tense for future reference, etc.) However, for counterfactuals, a conditional/subjunctive marker such as the Russian бы (by) generally appears in both condition and consequent clauses, and this normally accompanies the past tense form of the verb.

See Russian grammar, Bulgarian grammar, etc. for more detail.

== Logic ==
While the material conditional operator used in classical logic is sometimes read aloud in the form of a conditional sentence, the intuitive interpretation of conditional statements in natural language does not always correspond to it. Thus, philosophical logicians and formal semanticists have developed a wide variety of conditional logics that better match actual conditional language and conditional reasoning. They include the strict conditional and the variably strict conditional.

== See also ==
- Anankastic conditional
- Conditional mood
- Modality
- Propositional attitude
