= Ornative case =

Grammatical case

In linguistics, the ornative case is a noun case that means "endowed with" or "supplied with".

This case is found in Dumi, which marks it by the suffix -mi.

In Swahili, -enye is the ornative case particle. It takes a prefix dependent on the noun class of the head (preceding) noun and is followed by another noun, in expressions such as nyumba yenye chumba kimoja meaning "a house having one room".

== Similar derivations ==
In Hungarian, it is not considered as a case, but as an adjective-forming derivation, marked with the suffix -s (with the variants -os, -as, -es, -ös after a consonant). For example, "ajtó" ("door"), as in "zöld ajtós ház" ("a house with a green door"); "hálószoba" ("bedroom"), as in "2 hálószobás lakás" ("apartment with 2 bedrooms").

Same happens in Quechua, where the suffix -yuq derives a noun into another noun or into an adjective. For example, qillay ("money"), qillayyuq ("rich").

In English, the suffix -ed can be added to an adjective + noun phrase to mean "having"; for example four-footed ("having four feet"), yellow-breasted ("having a yellow breast").

== See also ==
- Comitative case
