= Montalbetti =

Montalbetti is a surname. Notable people with the surname include:

- Christine Montalbetti (born 1965), French novelist, playwright, and professor
- Éric Montalbetti (born 1968), French composer
- Mario Montalbetti (born 1958), Peruvian linguist
- Mauro Montalbetti (born 1969), Italian composer
