= Psychology of reasoning =

Study of how people reason

The psychology of reasoning (also known as the cognitive science of reasoning) is the study of how people reason, often broadly defined as the process of drawing conclusions to inform how people solve problems and make decisions. It overlaps with psychology, philosophy, linguistics, cognitive science, artificial intelligence, logic, and probability theory.

Psychological experiments on how humans and other animals reason have been carried out for over 100 years. An enduring question is whether or not people have the capacity to be rational. Current research in this area addresses various questions about reasoning, rationality, judgments, intelligence, relationships between emotion and reasoning, and development.

== Everyday reasoning ==
One of the most obvious areas in which people employ reasoning is with sentences in everyday language. Most experimentation on deduction has been carried out on hypothetical thought, in particular, examining how people reason about conditionals, e.g., If A then B. Participants in experiments make the modus ponens inference, given the indicative conditional If A then B, and given the premise A, they conclude B. However, given the indicative conditional and the minor premise for the modus tollens inference, not-B, about half of the participants in experiments conclude not-A and the remainder concludes that nothing follows.

The ease with which people make conditional inferences is affected by context, as demonstrated in the well-known selection task developed by Peter Wason. Participants are better able to test a conditional in an ecologically relevant context, e.g., if the envelope is sealed then it must have a 50 cent stamp on it compared to one that contains symbolic content, e.g., if the letter is a vowel then the number is even. Background knowledge can also lead to the suppression of even the simple modus ponens inference Participants given the conditional if Lisa has an essay to write then she studies late in the library and the premise Lisa has an essay to write make the modus ponens inference 'she studies late in the library', but the inference is suppressed when they are also given a second conditional if the library stays open then she studies late in the library. Interpretations of the suppression effect are controversial

Other investigations of propositional inference examine how people think about disjunctive alternatives, e.g., A or else B, and how they reason about negation, e.g., It is not the case that A and B. Many experiments have been carried out to examine how people make relational inferences, including comparisons, e.g., A is better than B. Such investigations also concern spatial inferences, e.g. A is in front of B and temporal inferences, e.g. A occurs before B. Other common tasks include categorical syllogisms, used to examine how people reason about quantifiers such as All or Some, e.g., Some of the A are not B. For example if all A are B and some B are C, what (if anything) follows?

== Theories of reasoning ==
There are several alternative theories of the cognitive processes that human reasoning is based on. One view is that people rely on a mental logic consisting of formal (abstract or syntactic) inference rules similar to those developed by logicians in the propositional calculus. Another view is that people rely on domain-specific or content-sensitive rules of inference. A third view is that people rely on mental models, that is, mental representations that correspond to imagined possibilities. A fourth view is that people compute probabilities.

One controversial theoretical issue is the identification of an appropriate competence model, or a standard against which to compare human reasoning. Initially classical logic was chosen as a competence model. Subsequently, some researchers opted for non-monotonic logic and Bayesian probability. Research on mental models and reasoning has led to the suggestion that people are rational in principle but err in practice. Connectionist approaches towards reasoning have also been proposed. Despite the ongoing debate about the cognitive processes involved in human reasoning, recent research has shown that multiple approaches can be useful in modeling human thinking. For instance, studies have found that people's reasoning is often influenced by their prior beliefs, which can be modeled using Bayesian probability theory. Additionally, research on mental models has shown that people tend to reason about problems by constructing multiple mental representations of the situation, which can help them to identify relevant features and make inferences based on their understanding of the problem. Moreover, connectionist approaches to reasoning have also gained attention, which focus on the neural network models that can learn from data and generalize to new situations.

== Development of reasoning ==
It is an active question in psychology how, why, and when the ability to reason develops from infancy to adulthood. Jean Piaget's theory of cognitive development posited general mechanisms and stages in the development of reasoning from infancy to adulthood. According to the neo-Piagetian theories of cognitive development, changes in reasoning with development come from increasing working memory capacity, increasing speed of processing, and enhanced executive functions and control. Increasing self-awareness is also an important factor.

In their book The Enigma of Reason, the cognitive scientists Hugo Mercier and Dan Sperber put forward an "argumentative" theory of reasoning, claiming that humans evolved to reason primarily to justify our beliefs and actions and to convince others in a social environment. Key evidence for their theory includes the errors in reasoning that solitary individuals are prone to when their arguments are not criticized, such as logical fallacies, and how groups become much better at performing cognitive reasoning tasks when they communicate with one another and can evaluate each other's arguments. Sperber and Mercier offer one attempt to resolve the apparent paradox that the confirmation bias is so strong despite the function of reasoning naively appearing to be to come to veridical conclusions about the world.

The study of the development of reasoning abilities is an ongoing area of research in psychology, and multiple factors have been proposed to explain how, why, and when reasoning develops from infancy to adulthood. Recent research has suggested that early experiences and social interactions play a critical role in the development of reasoning abilities. For example, studies have shown that infants as young as six months old can engage in basic logical reasoning, such as reasoning about the relationship between objects and their properties. Furthermore, research has highlighted the importance of parental interaction and cognitive stimulation in the development of children's reasoning abilities. Additionally, studies have suggested that cultural factors, such as educational practices and the emphasis on critical thinking, can also influence the development of reasoning skills across different populations.

== Different sorts of reasoning ==
Philip Johnson-Laird trying to taxonomize thought, distinguished between goal-directed thinking and thinking without goal, noting that association was involved in unrelated reading. He argues that goal directed reasoning can be classified based on the problem space involved in a solution, citing Allen Newell and Herbert A. Simon.

Inductive reasoning makes broad generalizations from specific cases or observations. In this process of reasoning, general assertions are made based on past specific pieces of evidence. This kind of reasoning allows the conclusion to be false even if the original statement is true. For example, if one observes a college athlete, one makes predictions and assumptions about other college athletes based on that one observation. Scientists use inductive reasoning to create theories and hypotheses. Philip Johnson-Laird distinguished inductive from deductive reasoning, in that the former creates semantic information while the later does not .

In opposition, deductive reasoning is a basic form of valid reasoning. In this reasoning process a person starts with a known claim or a general belief and from there asks what follows from these foundations or how will these premises influence other beliefs. In other words, deduction starts with a hypothesis and examines the possibilities to reach a conclusion. Deduction helps people understand why their predictions are wrong and indicates that their prior knowledge or beliefs are off track. An example of deduction can be seen in the scientific method when testing hypotheses and theories. Although the conclusion usually corresponds and therefore proves the hypothesis, there are some cases where the conclusion is logical, but the generalization is not. For example, the argument, "All young girls wear skirts; Julie is a young girl; therefore, Julie wears skirts" is valid logically, but is not sound because the first premise isn't true.

The syllogism is a form of deductive reasoning in which two statements reach a logical conclusion. With this reasoning, one statement could be "Every A is B" and another could be "This C is A". Those two statements could then lead to the conclusion that "This C is B". These types of syllogisms are used to test deductive reasoning to ensure there is a valid hypothesis. A Syllogistic Reasoning Task was created from a study performed by Morsanyi, Kinga, Handley, and Simon that examined the intuitive contributions to reasoning. They used this test to assess why "syllogistic reasoning performance is based on an interplay between a conscious and effortful evaluation of logicality and an intuitive appreciation of the believability of the conclusions".

Another form of reasoning is called abductive reasoning. This type is based on creating and testing hypotheses using the best information available. Abductive reasoning produces the kind of daily decision-making that works best with the information present, which often is incomplete. This could involve making educated guesses from observed unexplainable phenomena. This type of reasoning can be seen in the world when doctors make decisions about diagnoses from a set of results or when jurors use the relevant evidence to make decisions about a case.

Apart from the aforementioned types of reasoning, there is also analogical reasoning, which involves comparing and reasoning about two different situations or concepts to draw conclusions about a third. It can be used to make predictions or solve problems by finding similarities between two domains and transferring knowledge from one to the other. For example, a problem-solving approach that works in one domain may be applied to a new, similar problem in a different domain. Analogical reasoning is particularly useful in scientific discovery and problem-solving tasks, as it can help generate hypotheses, create new theories, and develop innovative solutions. However, it can also lead to errors if the similarities between domains are too superficial or if the analogy is based on false assumptions.

== Judgment and reasoning ==
Judgment and reasoning involve thinking through the options, making a judgment or conclusion and finally making a decision. Making judgments involves heuristics, or efficient strategies that usually lead one to the right answers. The most common heuristics used are attribute substitution, the availability heuristic, the representativeness heuristic and the anchoring heuristic – these all aid in quick reasoning and work in most situations. Heuristics allow for errors, a price paid to gain efficiency.

Other errors in judgment, therefore affecting reasoning, include errors in judgment about covariation – a relationship between two variables such that the presence and magnitude of one can predict the presence and magnitude of the other. One cause of covariation is confirmation bias, or the tendency to be more responsive to evidence that confirms one's own beliefs. But assessing covariation can be pulled off track by neglecting base-rate information – how frequently something occurs in general. However people often ignore base rates and tend to use other information presented.

There are more sophisticated judgment strategies that result in fewer errors. People often reason based on availability but sometimes they look for other, more accurate, information to make judgments. This suggests there are two ways of thinking, known as the Dual-Process Model. The first, System I, is fast, automatic and uses heuristics – more of intuition. The second, System II, is slower, effortful and more likely to be correct – more reasoning.

== Pragmatics and reasoning ==
The inferences people draw are related to factors such as linguistic pragmatics and emotion.

Decision making is often influenced by the emotion of regret and by the presence of risk. When people are presented with options, they tend to select the one that they think they will regret the least. In decisions that involve a large amount of risk, people tend to ask themselves how much dread they would experience were a worst-case scenario to occur, e.g. a nuclear accident, and then use that dread as an indicator of the level of risk.

Antonio Damasio suggests that somatic markers, certain memories that can cause a strong bodily reaction, act as a way to guide decision making as well. For example, when a person is remembering a scary movie and once again becomes tense, their palms might begin to sweat. Damasio argues that when making a decision people rely on their "gut feelings" to assess various options, and this makes them decide to go with a decision that is more positive and stay away from those that are negative. He also argues that the orbitofrontal cortex – located at the base of the frontal lobe, just above the eyes – is crucial in the use of somatic markers, because it is the part in the brain that allows people to interpret emotion.

When emotion shapes decisions, the influence is usually based on predictions of the future. When people ask themselves how they would react, they are making inferences about the future. Researchers suggest affective forecasting, the ability to predict one's own emotions, is poor because people tend to overestimate how much they will regret their errors.

Another factor that can influence decision making is linguistic pragmatics, which refers to the use of language in social contexts. Language can be used to convey different levels of politeness, power, and intention, which can all affect how people interpret and respond to messages. For example, if a boss asks an employee to complete a task using a commanding tone, the employee may feel more pressured to complete the task quickly, compared to if the boss asked in a polite tone. Similarly, if someone uses sarcasm or irony, it can be difficult for the listener to discern their true meaning, leading to misinterpretation and potentially poor decision making. In addition to linguistic pragmatics, cultural and social factors can also play a role in decision making. Different cultures may have different norms and values, which can influence how people approach decisions. For example, in collectivistic cultures, decisions may be made based on what is best for the group, whereas in individualistic cultures, decisions may prioritize individual needs and desires. Overall, decision making is a complex process that involves many factors, including emotion, risk, pragmatics, and cultural background. By understanding these factors, individuals can make more informed decisions and better navigate the complexities of the world around them.

== Neuroscience of reasoning ==
Studying reasoning neuroscientifically involves determining the neural correlates of reasoning, often investigated using event-related potentials and functional magnetic resonance imaging. In fMRI studies, participants are presented with variations of tasks to determine the different cognitive processes required. This is done by cross-referencing where in the brain there is more or less activation (as indexed by the blood-oxygen-level-dependent signal) on the different conditions with what other studies found for those regions. For example, if a condition leads to more activation of the hippocampus, then this may be interpreted as being related to memory retrieval—particularly if the theoretical framing of the task suggests that this is necessary.

== See also ==
- Bounded rationality
- Cognitive psychology
- Ecological rationality
- Emotional self-regulation
- Great Rationality Debate
- Heuristics in judgment and decision-making
- Naturalistic decision-making
