= Comparative illusion =

Sentences that appear to make sense but actually do not

In linguistics, a comparative illusion (CI) or Escher sentence (Note: These sentences have also been called dead ends, Russia sentences, or Montalbetti sentences.) is a comparative sentence which initially seems to be acceptable but upon closer reflection has no well-formed, sensical meaning. The typical example sentence used to typify this phenomenon is More people have been to Berlin than I have. (Note: James R. Hurford uses More people drink Guinness than I do and More students are flunking than you are as examples without the potentially ambiguous "have".) The effect has also been observed in other languages. Some studies have suggested that, at least in English, the effect is stronger for sentences whose predicate is repeatable. The effect has also been found to be stronger in some cases when there is a plural subject in the second clause.

== Overview of ungrammaticality ==
Escher sentences are ungrammatical because a matrix clause subject like more people is making a comparison between two sets of individuals, but there is no such set of individuals in the second clause. For the sentence to be grammatical, the subject of the second clause must be a bare plural. Linguists have marked that it is "striking" that, despite the grammar of these sentences not possibly having a meaningful interpretation, people so often report that they sound acceptable, and that it is "remarkable" that people seldom notice any error.

== History ==
Penrose stairs: "As this object is examined by following its surfaces, reappraisal has to be made very frequently."

Mario Montalbetti's 1984 Massachusetts Institute of Technology dissertation has been credited as being the first to note these sorts of sentences; in his prologue he gives acknowledgements to Hermann Schultze "for uttering the most amazing */? sentence I've ever heard: More people have been to Berlin than I have", although the dissertation itself does not discuss such sentences. Parallel examples with Russia instead of Berlin were briefly discussed in psycholinguistic work in the 1990s and 2000s by Thomas Bever and colleagues.

Geoffrey K. Pullum wrote about this phenomenon in a 2004 post on Language Log after Jim McCloskey brought it to his attention. In a post the following day, Mark Liberman gave the name "Escher sentences" to such sentences in reference to M. C. Escher's 1960 lithograph Ascending and Descending. He wrote:

All these stimuli [i.e., these sentences, Penrose stairs, and the Shepard tone] involve familiar and coherent local cues whose global integration is contradictory or impossible. These stimuli also all seem OK in the absence of scrutiny. Casual, unreflective uptake has no real problem with them; you need to pay attention and think about them a bit before you notice that something is going seriously wrong.

Although rare, instances of this construction have appeared in natural text. Language Log has noted examples such as:

1. With him breathing down my neck, I was still able to focus on what I was doing ... More people have analyzed it than I have, but it's a nice notion that Tiger was up near the lead and I outplayed him.
2. I admit that more people have been to Iraq than I have, so I don't know everything.

Another attested example is the following tweet from Dan Rather:

3. I think there are more candidates on stage who speak Spanish more fluently than our president speaks English.

== Research ==
Experiments on the acceptability of comparative illusion sentences has found results which are "highly variable both within and across studies". While the illusion of acceptability for comparative illusions has also been informally reported for speakers of Faroese, German, (Note: German does not allow the same sort of VP-ellipsis in comparative sentences, so the sorts of examples examined such as In Paris sind mehr Leute gewesen als ich war are not quite parallel.) Icelandic, Polish, and Swedish, systematic investigation has mostly centered on English, although Aarhus University neurolinguist Ken Ramshøj Christensen has run several experiments on comparative illusions in Danish.

=== Perceived meanings ===
When Danish (da) and Swedish (sv) speakers were asked what (1) means, their responses fell into one of the following categories:

Flere folk har været i Paris end {} jeg har.
Fler människor har varit i Paris än vad jag har.
More people have been in Paris than what I have.
'More people have been to Paris than I have.'

1. Some people have been to Paris [except me]. (da: 28.9%; sv: 12.0%)
2. More people have been to Paris [than (just) me]. (da: 21.1%; sv: 28.0%)
3. Some people have been to Paris [more (often) than I have]. (da: 15.8%; sv: 4.0%)
4. More people have been to Paris [than I own]. (da: 13.2%; sv: 16.0%)
5. Other (e.g., repeating the original sentence). (da: 13.2%; sv: 12.0%)
6. It does not make sense. (da: 7.9%; sv: 28.0%)

Paraphrase (d) is in fact the only possible interpretation of (1); this is possible due to the lexical ambiguity of har "have" between an auxiliary verb and a lexical verb just as the English have; however, the majority of participants (da: 78.9%; sv: 56%) gave a paraphrase which does not follow from the grammar. Another study where Danish participants had to pick from a set of paraphrases, say it meant something else, or say it was meaningless found that people selected "It does not make sense" for comparative illusions 63% of the time and selected it meant something 37% of the time.

=== Ellipsis ===
The first study examining what affects acceptability of these sentences was presented at the 2004 CUNY Conference on Human Sentence Processing. Scott Fults and Collin Phillips found that Escher sentences with ellipsis (a) were found to be more acceptable than the same sentences without ellipsis (b).

1. More people have been to Russia than I have.
2. More people have been to Russia than I have been to Russia.

Responses to this study noted that it only compared elided material to nothing, and that even in grammatical comparatives, ellipsis of repeated phrases is preferred. In order to control for the awkwardness of identical predicates, Alexis Wellwood and colleagues compared comparative illusions with ellipsis to those with a different predicate.

1. More girls ate pizza than the boy {did} / {ate yogurt}.

They found that both CI-type and control sentences were found to be slightly more acceptable with ellipsis, which led them to reject the hypothesis that ellipsis was responsible for the acceptability of CIs. Rather, it is possible people just prefer shorter sentences in general. Patrick Kelley's Michigan State University dissertation found similar results.

=== Repeatability ===
Alexis Wellwood and colleagues have found in experiments that the illusion of grammaticality is greater when the sentence's predicate denotes a repeatable event. For instance, (a) is experimentally found to be more acceptable than (b).

1. More undergrads call their families during the week than I do.
2. More New Yorkers began law school this semester than I did.

The comparative must be in the subject position for the illusion to work; sentences like (a) which also have verb phrase ellipsis are viewed as unacceptable without any illusion of acceptability:

1. *I have been to more countries than Russia I have.

A pilot study by Iria de Dios-Flores also found that repeatability of the predicate had an effect on the acceptability of CIs in English. However, Christensen's study on comparative illusions in Danish did not find a significant difference in acceptability for sentences with repeatable predicates (a) and those without (b).

Flere mænd har spist kød end kvinder har ifølge rapporten.
More men have eaten meat than women have according.to report-the
'More men have eaten meat than women have according to the report.'

Flere drenge har mistet hørelsen end piger har i Danmark.
More boys have lost hearing-the than girls have in Denmark
'More boys have lost the sense of hearing than girls have in Denmark.'

=== Quantifier choice ===
The lexical ambiguity of the English quantifier more has led to a hypothesis where the acceptability of CIs is due to people reinterpreting a "comparative" more as an "additive" more. As fewer does not have such an ambiguity, Wellwood and colleagues tested to see if there was any difference in acceptability judgements depending on whether the sentences used fewer or more. In general, their study found significantly higher acceptability for sentences with more than with fewer but the difference did not disproportionately affect the comparative illusion sentences compared to the controls.

Christensen found no significant difference in acceptability for Danish CIs with flere ("more") compared to those with færre ("fewer").

=== Subject choice ===
Experiments have also investigated the effects different kinds of subjects in the than-clause have on CIs' acceptability. Wellwood and colleagues found that sentences with first person singular pronoun I to be more acceptable than those with the third person singular pronoun he, though they note this might be due to discourse effects and the lack of a prior antecedent for he. They found no significant difference for sentences with a singular third person pronoun (he) and those with a singular definite description (the boy). There was no difference in number for the first person pronominal subject (I vs. we), but plural definite descriptions (the boys) were significantly more acceptable than singular definite descriptions (the boy). Christensen found that plural subjects (kvinder, "women") in the than-clause led to significantly higher acceptability ratings than singular subjects (frisøren "the hairdresser").

De Dios-Flores examined if there was an effect depending on whether or not the than-clause subject could be a subset of the matrix subject as in (a) compared to those where it could not be due to a gender mismatch as in (b). No significant differences were found.

1. More PhD students presented in conferences than she did.
2. More policewomen visited the headquarters than he did.

=== Other grammatical factors ===
In a study of Danish speakers, CIs with prepositional sentential adverbials like om aftenen "in the evening" were found to be less acceptable than those without.

Comparatives in Bulgarian can optionally have the degree operator колкото (kolkoto); sentences with this morpheme (a) are immediately found unacceptable but those without it (b) produce the same illusion of acceptability.

Повече хора са били в Русия от-колкото аз.
Poveche hora sa bili v Rusiya ot-kolkoto az.
more people are been in Russia from-how.many I
'More people have been to Russia than me.'

Повече хора са били в Русия от мен.
Poveche hora sa bili v Rusiya ot men.
more people are been in Russia than me
'More people have been to Russia than me.'

=== Neurolinguistics ===
A neuroimaging study of Danish speakers found less activation in the left inferior frontal gyrus, left premotor cortex (BA 4, 6), and left posterior temporal cortex (BA 21, 22) when processing CIs like (a) than when processing grammatical clausal comparatives like (b). Christensen has suggested this shows CIs are easy to process but as they are nonsensical, processing is "shallow". Low LIFG activation levels also suggest that people do not perceive CIs as being semantically anomalous.

Flere mænd har boet i telt end Marie har.
More men have lived in tent than Mary has.
'More men have lived in a tent than Mary has.'

Flere mænd har boet i telt end på hotel.
More men have lived in tent than on hotel.
'More men have lived in a tent than in a hotel.'

== Explanations ==
Townsend and Bever have posited that Escher sentences get perceived as acceptable because they are an apparent blend of two grammatical templates.

1. More people have gone to Russia than I ... (could believe).
2. ... people have gone to Russia [more] than I have...

Wellwood and colleagues have noted in response that the possibility of each clause being grammatical in a different sentence (a, b) does not guarantee a blend (c) would be acceptable.

1. Mary is too tall to get on this ride.
2. Mary has ridden some ride as many times as Bill has.
3. →*Mary is too tall as Bill has.

Wellwood and colleagues also interpret Townsend and Bever's theory as requiring a shared lexical element in each template. If this version is right, they predict (c) would be viewed as less acceptable due to the ungrammaticality of (b):

1. Fewer people have been to Russia than I would have thought.
2. *People have been to Russia fewer than I have.
3. →?Fewer people have been to Russia than I have.

Wellwood and colleagues, based on their experimental results, have rejected Townsend and Bever's hypothesis and instead support their event comparison hypothesis, which states that comparative illusions are due to speakers reinterpreting these sentences as discussing a comparison of events.

== Examples ==
- More people have been to Russia than I have
- Why is it colder during the night than outside?
- Who did he tell you that to?

== Similar constructions ==
The term "comparative illusion" has sometimes been used as an umbrella term which also encompasses "depth charge" sentences like "No head injury is too trivial to be ignored." This example, first discussed by Peter Cathcart Wason and Shuli Reich in 1979, is very often initially perceived as having the meaning "No head injury should be ignored—even if it's trivial", even though upon careful consideration the sentence actually says "All head injuries should be ignored—even trivial ones." The authors illustrate their point by comparing the sentence to "No missile is too small to be banned."

Phillips and colleagues have discussed other grammatical illusions with respect to attraction, case in German, binding, and negative polarity items; speakers initially find such sentences acceptable, but later realize they are ungrammatical. It has also been compared to the "missing VP illusion".

== See also ==
- Garden-path sentences, which are grammatical but are often initially parsed in a way which leads to unacceptability
- Center embedding, which can produce sentences which are grammatical but are often viewed as unacceptable due to difficulty in parsing
- Irish bull
- Colorless green ideas sleep furiously
