= Thog =

Thog may refer to

- Thog (comics), a Marvel comics character
- the THOG problem, a logic puzzle by psychologist Peter Wason
- Thog, a character in the webcomic The Order of the Stick
- Thog (Muppet), a large blue monster in The Muppet Show
- Haley Thogmartin, a HouseGuest from Big Brother 28, comically known as "Thog"
