= Wason verbal illusion =

Cognitive illusion involving misinterpretation of negated sentences

The Wason verbal illusion is a cognitive illusion in psycholinguistics where certain grammatically complex sentences are misinterpreted to mean the opposite of their literal meaning. Identified by Peter Wason and Shuli Reich in 1979, it shows how pragmatic expectations and world knowledge can override syntactic interpretation during comprehension. The most famous example is the sentence "No head injury is too trivial to be ignored," which most people interpret as meaning that head injuries should not be ignored, when the literal meaning implies that all head injuries should be ignored.

Explanations for this misinterpretation range from cognitive overload due to multiple negations to theories suggesting listeners unconsciously "correct" the sentence to a more plausible meaning.

== Description ==
Wason and Reich explain the illusion in this way:

Consider the following sentence: No head injury is too trivial to be ignored. Now consider this sentence: No missile is too small to be banned. Most people correctly suppose that the second sentence means that all missiles should be banned however small. By parity of argument, it follows that the first sentence (hereafter called the target sentence) means that all head injuries should be ignored however trivial.

The verbal illusion occurs with sentences following the construction "No X is too Y to be Z-ed," particularly when the sentence contains multiple negative elements and expresses a meaning that contradicts common beliefs or expectations. These sentences are also referred to as "depth-charge sentences" in the literature, a term reflecting how the misinterpretation often occurs after initial processing, similar to a delayed explosion.

The illusion is characterized by its persistence; even when the correct interpretation is explained, people often have difficulty accepting it and continue to perceive the incorrect meaning as more natural. Unlike typical ambiguous sentences, the interpretation does not fluctuate between meanings once formed.

== Theoretical explanations ==
=== Semantic and pragmatic anomaly ===
Wason and Reich identified two types of anomalies in these sentences. First, a semantic anomaly exists in the relationship between the adjective and verb. In the sentence "No head injury is too trivial to be ignored," the construction implies that more trivial injuries are less worthy of being ignored, contradicting the typical relationship where trivial things are more likely to be ignored. Second, a pragmatic anomaly occurs when the literal meaning contradicts commonly held beliefs—in this case, that head injuries should receive medical attention.

=== Cognitive load hypothesis ===
Another explanation suggests that the multiple negations in these sentences (which can contain up to four negative elements) overload working memory capacity, causing processing failure. When compositional processing fails, readers resort to non-compositional, heuristic interpretation based on world knowledge and lexical associations.

=== Noisy-channel framework ===
Recent research has proposed a noisy-channel explanation, suggesting that readers interpret these sentences through Bayesian inference, weighing the plausibility of possible meanings against the likelihood that communication errors occurred. In this view, readers unconsciously reinterpret sentences to make them more plausible, as if extra negations were accidental.

=== Construction grammar approach ===
An alternative view argues that the "No X is too Y to Z" pattern has become grammaticalized as a construction with conventionalized non-compositional meaning. This perspective suggests the illusion reflects linguistic competence rather than a processing failure.

== Experimental evidence ==
=== Original experiments ===
Wason and Reich's original experiments tested participants' ability to paraphrase sentences varying in pragmatic plausibility. They found that pragmatically plausible sentences (where the literal meaning aligned with world knowledge) were paraphrased correctly more often than pragmatically anomalous sentences. In their study, less than ten percent of participants correctly interpreted the target sentence about head injuries.

=== Cross-linguistic studies ===
The phenomenon has been observed in multiple languages beyond English. Studies have replicated the effect in Danish, German, and Greek, suggesting it reflects general cognitive processing constraints rather than language-specific features. The strength of the illusion varies across languages and sentence types.

=== Processing studies ===
Eye-tracking studies have shown that readers do not experience increased processing difficulty at the point where compositional interpretation should fail, suggesting non-compositional processing occurs automatically. Studies measuring reading times and comprehension have found that world knowledge and sentence plausibility are strong predictors of misinterpretation rates.

== Factors affecting the illusion ==
Research has identified several factors that influence the strength of the verbal illusion:

- Number of negations: Sentences with more negative elements produce stronger illusions.
- Plausibility: Sentences whose literal meaning contradicts world knowledge are more likely to be misinterpreted.
- Semantic relationships: The logical relationship between the adjective and verb affects processing difficulty.
- Working memory capacity: Some evidence suggests individuals with higher working memory capacity may be less susceptible to the illusion.

== Related phenomena ==
The Wason verbal illusion shares characteristics with other linguistic illusions including comparative illusion sentences (e.g., "More people have been to Russia than I have") and garden path sentences. These phenomena collectively demonstrate that language comprehension involves both compositional processing and heuristic strategies based on plausibility and world knowledge.

== Significance ==
The Wason verbal illusion has been interpreted as evidence that comprehension may not be purely compositional but involves interactions between syntactic parsing, semantic interpretation, and pragmatic knowledge. The illusion has been used to support theories of "good enough" processing, where comprehenders settle for interpretations that are plausible rather than fully analyzing a sentence's structure.

== See also ==
- Peter Cathcart Wason
- Psycholinguistics
- Cognitive bias
- Pragmatics
- Negation
- Garden path sentence
- Comparative illusion
- Sentence processing
