= Dual process theory =

Psychological theory of how thought can arise in two different ways

In psychology, a dual process theory provides an account of how thought can arise in two different ways, or as a result of two different processes. Often, the two processes consist of an implicit (automatic), unconscious process and an explicit (controlled), conscious process. Verbalized explicit processes or attitudes and actions may change with persuasion or education; though implicit process or attitudes usually take a long amount of time to change with the forming of new habits. Dual process theories can be found in social, personality, cognitive, and clinical psychology. It has also been linked with economics via prospect theory and behavioral economics, and increasingly in sociology through cultural analysis.

== History ==
The foundations of dual process theory are probably ancient. Spinoza (1632-1677) distinguished between the passions and reason. William James (1842-1910) believed that there were two different kinds of thinking: associative and true reasoning. James theorized that empirical thought was used for things like art and design work. For James, images and thoughts would come to mind of past experiences, providing ideas of comparison or abstractions. He claimed that associative knowledge was only from past experiences describing it as "only reproductive". James believed that true reasoning could enable overcoming "unprecedented situations" just as a map could enable navigating past obstacles.

There are various dual process theories that were produced after William James's work. Dual process models are very common in the study of social psychological variables, such as attitude change. Examples include Petty and Cacioppo's elaboration likelihood model (explained below) and Chaiken's heuristic systematic model. According to these models, persuasion may occur after either intense scrutiny or extremely superficial thinking. In cognitive psychology, attention and working memory have also been conceptualized as relying on two distinct processes. Whether the focus be on social psychology or cognitive psychology, there are many examples of dual process theories produced throughout the past. The following just show a glimpse into the variety that can be found.

Peter Wason and Jonathan St B. T. Evans suggested dual process theory in 1974. In Evans' later theory, there are two distinct types of processes: heuristic processes and analytic processes. He suggested that during heuristic processes, an individual chooses which information is relevant to the current situation. Relevant information is then processed further whereas irrelevant information is not. Following the heuristic processes come analytic processes. During analytic processes, the relevant information that is chosen during the heuristic processes is then used to make judgments about the situation.

Richard E. Petty and John Cacioppo proposed a dual process theory focused in the field of social psychology in 1986. Their theory is called the elaboration likelihood model of persuasion. In their theory, there are two different routes to persuasion in making decisions. The first route is known as the central route and this takes place when a person is thinking carefully about a situation, elaborating on the information they are given, and creating an argument. This route occurs when an individual's motivation and ability are high. The second route is known as the peripheral route and this takes place when a person is not thinking carefully about a situation and uses shortcuts to make judgments. This route occurs when an individual's motivation or ability are low.

Steven Sloman produced another interpretation on dual processing in 1996. He believed that associative reasoning takes stimuli and divides it into logical clusters of information based on statistical regularity. He proposed that how you associate is directly proportional to the similarity of past experiences, relying on temporal and similarity relations to determine reasoning rather than an underlying mechanical structure. The other reasoning process in Sloman's opinion was of the Rule-based system. The system functioned on logical structure and variables based upon rule systems to come to conclusions different from that of the associative system. He also believed that the Rule-based system had control over the associative system, though it could only suppress it. This interpretation corresponds well to earlier work on computational models of dual processes of reasoning.

Daniel Kahneman provided further interpretation by differentiating the two styles of processing more, calling them intuition and reasoning in 2003. Intuition (or system 1), similar to associative reasoning, was determined to be fast and automatic, usually with strong emotional bonds included in the reasoning process. Kahneman said that this kind of reasoning was based on formed habits and very difficult to change or manipulate. Reasoning (or system 2) was slower and much more volatile, being subject to conscious judgments and attitudes.

Fritz Strack and Roland Deutsch proposed another dual process theory focused in the field of social psychology in 2004 called the Reflective-Impulsive Model (RIM). According to their model, there are two separate systems that control human behavior: the reflective system and the impulsive system. In the reflective system, symbolic representations and propositional reasoning are used to guide decision-making processes based on knowledge, values, and goals. On the other hand, in the impulsive system, decisions are made using associative processes that are automatic based on temporal and spatial proximity. Unlike other dual-process models, Strack and Deutsch emphasize that both systems operate in parallel and interact with each other.

== Theories ==
=== Dual process learning model ===
Ron Sun proposed a dual-process model of learning (both implicit learning and explicit learning). The model (named CLARION) re-interpreted voluminous behavioral data in psychological studies of implicit learning and skill acquisition in general. The resulting theory is two-level and interactive, based on the idea of the interaction of one-shot explicit rule learning (i.e., explicit learning) and gradual implicit tuning through reinforcement (i.e. implicit learning), and it accounts for many previously unexplained cognitive data and phenomena based on the interaction of implicit and explicit learning.

The Dual Process Learning model can be applied to a group-learning environment. This is called The Dual Objective Model of Cooperative Learning and it requires a group practice that consists of both cognitive and affective skills among the team. It involves active participation by the teacher to monitor the group throughout its entirety until the product has been successfully completed. The teacher focuses on the effectiveness of cognitive and affective practices within the group's cooperative learning environment. The instructor acts as an aide to the group by encouraging their positive affective behavior and ideas. In addition, the teacher remains, continually watching for improvement in the group's development of the product and interactions amongst the students. The teacher will interject to give feedback on ways the students can better contribute affectively or cognitively to the group as a whole. The goal is to foster a sense of community amongst the group while creating a proficient product that is a culmination of each student's unique ideas.

=== Dual coding ===
Using a somewhat different approach, Allan Paivio has developed a dual-coding theory of information processing. According to this model, cognition involves the coordinated activity of two independent, but connected systems, a nonverbal system and a verbal system that is specialized to deal with language. The nonverbal system is hypothesized to have developed earlier in evolution. Both systems rely on different areas of the brain. Paivio has reported evidence that nonverbal, visual images are processed more efficiently and are approximately twice as memorable. Additionally, the verbal and nonverbal systems are additive, so one can improve memory by using both types of information during learning. This additive dual coding claim is compatible with evidence that verbalized thinking does not necessarily overcome common faulty intuitions or heuristics, such as studies showing that thinking aloud during heuristics and biases tests did not necessarily improve performance on the test.

=== Dual-process accounts of reasoning ===
==== Background ====
Dual-process accounts of reasoning postulate that there are two systems or minds in one brain. A current theory is that there are two cognitive systems underlying thinking and reasoning and that these different systems were developed through evolution. These systems are often referred to as "implicit" and "explicit" or by the more neutral "System 1" and "System 2", as coined by Keith Stanovich and Richard West.

The systems have multiple names by which they can be called, as well as many different properties.

==== System 1 ====
John Bargh reconceptualized the notion of an automatic process by breaking down the term "automatic" into four components: awareness, intentionality, efficiency, and controllability. One way for a process to be labeled as automatic is for the person to be unaware of it. There are three ways in which a person may be unaware of a mental process: they can be unaware of the presence of the stimulus (subliminal), how the stimulus is categorized or interpreted (unaware of the activation of stereotype or trait constructs), or the effect the stimulus has on the person's judgments or actions (misattribution). Another way for a mental process to be labeled as automatic is for it to be unintentional. Intentionality refers to the conscious "start up" of a process. An automatic process may begin without the person consciously willing it to start. The third component of automaticity is efficiency. Efficiency refers to the amount of cognitive resources required for a process. An automatic process is efficient because it requires few resources. The fourth component is controllability, referring to the person's conscious ability to stop a process. An automatic process is uncontrollable, meaning that the process will run until completion and the person will not be able to stop it. Bargh conceptualized automaticity as a component view (any combination awareness, intention, efficiency, and control) as opposed to the historical concept of automaticity as an all-or-none dichotomy.

One takeaway from the psychological research on dual process theory is that our System 1 (intuition) is more accurate in areas where we've gathered a lot of data with reliable and fast feedback, like social dynamics, or even cognitive domains in which we've become expert or even merely familiar.

==== System 2 in humans ====
System 2 is evolutionarily recent and speculated as specific to humans. It is also known as the explicit system, the rule-based system, the rational system, or the analytic system. It performs the more slow and sequential thinking. It is domain-general, performed in the central working memory system. Because of this, it has a limited capacity and is slower than System 1 which correlates it with general intelligence. It is known as the rational system because it reasons according to logical standards. Some overall properties associated with System 2 are that it is rule-based, analytic, controlled, demanding of cognitive capacity, and slow.

== Social psychology ==
The dual process has impact on social psychology in such domains as stereotyping, categorization, and judgment. Especially, the study of automaticity and of implicit in dual process theories has the most influence on a person's perception. People usually perceive other people's information and categorize them by age, gender, race, or role. According to Neuberg and Fiske (1987) a perceiver who receives a good amount of information about the target person then will use their formal mental category (Unconscious) as a basis for judging the person. When the perceiver is distracted, the perceiver has to pay more attention to target information (Conscious). Categorization is the basic process of stereotyping in which people are categorized into social groups that have specific stereotypes associated with them. It is able to retrieve people's judgment automatically without subjective intention or effort. Attitude can also be activated spontaneously by the object. John Bargh's study offered an alternative view, holding that essentially all attitudes, even weak ones are capable of automatic activation. Whether the attitude is formed automatically or operates with effort and control, it can still bias further processing of information about the object and direct the perceivers' actions with regard to the target. According to Shelly Chaiken, heuristic processing is the activation and application of judgmental rules and heuristics are presumed to be learned and stored in memory. It is used when people are making accessible decisions such as "experts are always right" (system 1) and systematic processing is inactive when individuals make effortful scrutiny of all the relevant information which requires cognitive thinking (system 2). The heuristic and systematic processing then influence the domain of attitude change and social influence.

Unconscious thought theory is the counterintuitive and contested view that the unconscious mind is adapted to highly complex decision making. Where most dual system models define complex reasoning as the domain of effortful conscious thought, UTT argues complex issues are best dealt with unconsciously.

=== Stereotyping ===
Dual process models of stereotyping propose that when we perceive an individual, salient stereotypes pertaining to them are activated automatically. These activated representations will then guide behavior if no other motivation or cognition take place. However, controlled cognitive processes can inhibit the use of stereotypes when there is motivation and cognitive resources to do so. Devine (1989) provided evidence for the dual process theory of stereotyping in a series of three studies. Study 1 linked found prejudice (according to the Modern Racism Scale) was unrelated to knowledge of cultural stereotypes of African Americans. Study 2 showed that subjects used automatically activated stereotypes in judgments regardless of prejudice level (personal belief). Participants were primed with stereotype relevant or non-relevant words and then asked to give hostility ratings of a target with an unspecified race who was performing ambiguously hostile behaviors. Regardless of prejudice level, participants who were primed with more stereotype-relevant words gave higher hostility ratings to the ambiguous target. Study 3 investigated whether people can control stereotype use by activating personal beliefs. Low-prejudice participants asked to list African Americans listed more positive examples than did those high in prejudice.

=== Terror management theory and the dual process model ===
According to psychologists Pyszczynski, Greenberg, & Solomon, the dual process model, in relation to terror management theory, identifies two systems by which the brain manages fear of death: distal and proximal. Distal defenses fall under the system 1 category because it is unconscious whereas proximal defenses fall under the system 2 category because it operates with conscious thought. However, recent work by the ManyLabs project has shown that the mortality salience effect (e.g., reflecting on one's own death encouraging a greater defense of one's own worldview) has failed to replicate (ManyLabs attempt to replicate a seminal theoretical finding across multiple laboratories—in this case some of these labs included input from the original terror management theorists.)

Distal defenses	Proximal defenses
Deal with subconscious, abstract ideas of death	Deal with conscious thoughts of death at the level of a specific threat
Experiential	Rational
Occur when mortality is not salient	Occur immediately after direct reminder or threat of mortality
Occur in response to subliminal reminders of death	Does not occur after subliminal reminders of death
Operate by self-conception as a part of a death-transcendent reality (i.e. thinking of oneself as part of a culture that will endure beyond one's own life).	Operate by pushing thoughts of death into the distant future and removing them from conscious thought

=== Dual process and habituation ===
Habituation can be described as decreased response to a repeated stimulus. According to Groves and Thompson, the process of habituation also mimics a dual process. The dual process theory of behavioral habituation relies on two underlying (non-behavioral) processes; depression and facilitation with the relative strength of one over the other determining whether or not habituation or sensitization is seen in the behavior. Habituation weakens the intensity of a repeated stimulus over time subconsciously. As a result, a person will give the stimulus less conscious attention over time. Conversely, sensitization subconsciously strengthens a stimulus over time, giving the stimulus more conscious attention. Though these two systems are not both conscious, they interact to help people understand their surroundings by strengthening some stimuli and diminishing others.

=== Dual process and steering cognition ===
According to Walker, system 1 functions as a serial cognitive steering processor for system 2, rather than a parallel system. In large-scale repeated studies with school students, Walker tested how students adjusted their imagined self-operation in different curriculum subjects of maths, science and English. He showed that students consistently adjust the biases of their heuristic self-representation to specific states for the different curriculum subjects. The model of cognitive steering proposes that, in order to process epistemically varied environmental data, a heuristic orientation system is required to align varied, incoming environmental data with existing neural algorithmic processes. The brain's associative simulation capacity, centered around the imagination, plays an integrator role to perform this function. Evidence for early-stage concept formation and future self-operation within the hippocampus supports the model. In the cognitive steering model, a conscious state emerges from effortful associative simulation, required to align novel data accurately with remote memory, via later algorithmic processes. By contrast, fast unconscious automaticity is constituted by unregulated simulatory biases, which induce errors in subsequent algorithmic processes. The phrase 'rubbish in, rubbish out' is used to explain errorful heuristic processing: errors will always occur if the accuracy of initial retrieval and location of data is poorly self-regulated.

=== Application in economic behavior ===
According to Alos-Ferrer and Strack the dual-process theory has relevance in economic decision-making through the multiple-selves model, in which one person's self-concept is composed of multiple selves depending on the context. An example of this is someone who as a student is hard working and intelligent, but as a sibling is caring and supportive. Decision-making involves the use of both automatic and controlled processes, but also depends on the person and situation, and given a person's experiences and current situation the decision process may differ. Given that there are two decision processes with differing goals one is more likely to be more useful in particular situations. For example, a person is presented with a decision involving a selfish but rational motive and a social motive. Depending on the individual one of the motives will be more appealing than the other, but depending on the situation the preference for one motive or the other may change. Using the dual-process theory it is important to consider whether one motive is more automatic than the other, and in this particular case the automaticity would depend on the individual and their experiences. A selfish person may choose the selfish motive with more automaticity than a non-selfish person, and yet a controlled process may still outweigh this based on external factors such as the situation, monetary gains, or societal pressure. Although there is likely to be a stable preference for which motive one will select based on the individual it is important to remember that external factors will influence the decision. Dual process theory also provides a different source of behavioral heterogeneity in economics. It is mostly assumed within economics that this heterogeneity comes from differences in taste and rationality, while dual process theory indicates necessary considerations of which processes are automated and how these different processes may interact within decision making.

=== Moral psychology ===
Moral judgments are said to be explained in part by dual process theory. In moral dilemmas we are presented us with two morally unpalatable options. For example, should we sacrifice one life in order to save many lives or just let many lives be lost? Consider a historical example: should we authorize the use of force against other nations in order to prevent "any future acts of international terrorism" or should we take a more pacifist approach to foreign lives and risk the possibility of terrorist attack? Dual process theorists have argued that sacrificing something of moral value in order to prevent a worse outcome (often called the "utilitarian" option) involves more reflective reasoning than the more pacifist (also known as the "deontological" option). However, some evidence suggests that this is not always the case, that reflection can sometimes increase harm-rejection responses, and that reflection correlates with both the sacrificial and pacifist (but not more anti-social) responses. So some have proposed that tendencies toward sacrificing for the greater good or toward pacifism are better explained by factors besides the two processes proposed by dual process theorists.

=== Religiosity ===
Various studies have found that performance on tests designed to require System 2 thinking (a.k.a., reflection tests) can predict differences in philosophical tendencies, including religiosity (i.e., the degree to which one reports being involved in organized religion). This "analytic atheist" effect has even been found among samples of people that include academic philosophers. Nonetheless, some studies detect this correlation between atheism and reflective, System 2 thinking in only some of the countries that they study, suggesting that it is not just intuitive and reflective thinking that predict variance in religiosity, but also cultural differences.

== Evidence ==
=== Belief bias effect ===
A belief bias is the tendency to judge the strength of arguments based on the plausibility of their conclusion rather than how strongly they support that conclusion. Some evidence suggests that this bias results from competition between logical (System 2) and belief-based (System 1) processes during evaluation of arguments.

Studies on belief-bias effect were first designed by Jonathan Evans to create a conflict between logical reasoning and prior knowledge about the truth of conclusions. Participants are asked to evaluate syllogisms that are: valid arguments with believable conclusions, valid arguments with unbelievable conclusions, invalid arguments with believable conclusions, and invalid arguments with unbelievable conclusions. Participants are told to only agree with conclusions that logically follow from the premises given. The results suggest when the conclusion is believable, people erroneously accept invalid conclusions as valid more often than invalid arguments are accepted which support unpalatable conclusions. This is taken to suggest that System 1 beliefs are interfering with the logic of System 2.

=== Tests with working memory ===
De Neys conducted a study that manipulated working memory capacity while answering syllogistic problems. This was done by burdening executive processes with secondary tasks. Results showed that when System 1 triggered the correct response, the distractor task had no effect on the production of a correct answer which supports the fact that System 1 is automatic and works independently of working memory, but when belief-bias was present (System 1 belief-based response was different from the logically correct System 2 response) the participants performance was impeded by the decreased availability of working memory. This falls in accordance with the knowledge about System 1 and System 2 of the dual-process accounts of reasoning because System 1 was shown to work independent of working memory, and System 2 was impeded due to a lack of working memory space so System 1 took over which resulted in a belief-bias.

=== fMRI studies ===
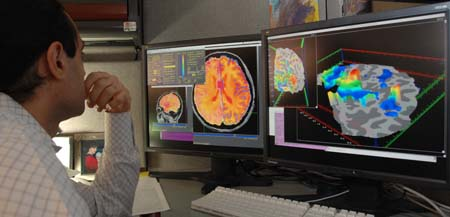
Researcher conducting Functional magnetic resonance imaging test

Vinod Goel and others produced neuropsychological evidence for dual-process accounts of reasoning using fMRI studies. They provided evidence that anatomically distinct parts of the brain were responsible for the two different kinds of reasoning. They found that content-based reasoning caused left temporal hemisphere activation whereas abstract formal problem reasoning activated the parietal system. They concluded that different kinds of reasoning, depending on the semantic content, activated one of two different systems in the brain.

A similar study incorporated fMRI during a belief-bias test. They found that different mental processes were competing for control of the response to the problems given in the belief-bias test. The prefrontal cortex was critical in detecting and resolving conflicts, which are characteristic of System 2, and had already been associated with that System 2. The ventral medial prefrontal cortex, known to be associated with the more intuitive or heuristic responses of System 1, was the area in competition with the prefrontal cortex.

=== Near-infrared spectroscopy ===
Tsujii and Watanabe did a follow-up study to Goel and Dolan's fMRI experiment. They examined the neural correlates on the inferior frontal cortex (IFC) activity in belief-bias reasoning using near-infrared spectroscopy (NIRS). Subjects performed a syllogistic reasoning task, using congruent and incongruent syllogisms, while attending to an attention-demanding secondary task. The interest of the researchers was in how the secondary-tasks changed the activity of the IFC during congruent and incongruent reasoning processes. The results showed that the participants performed better in the congruent test than in the incongruent test (evidence for belief bias); the high demand secondary test impaired the incongruent reasoning more than it impaired the congruent reasoning. NIRS results showed that the right IFC was activated more during incongruent trials. Participants with enhanced right IFC activity performed better on the incongruent reasoning than those with decreased right IFC activity. This study provided some evidence to enhance the fMRI results that the right IFC, specifically, is critical in resolving conflicting reasoning, but that it is also attention-demanding; its effectiveness decreases with loss of attention. The loss of effectiveness in System 2 following loss of attention makes the automatic heuristic System 1 take over, which results in belief bias.

=== Matching bias ===
Matching bias is a non-logical heuristic. The matching bias is described as a tendency to use lexical content matching of the statement about which one is reasoning, to be seen as relevant information and do the opposite as well, ignore relevant information that doesn't match. It mostly affects problems with abstract content. It doesn't involve prior knowledge and beliefs but it is still seen as a System 1 heuristic that competes with the logical System 2.

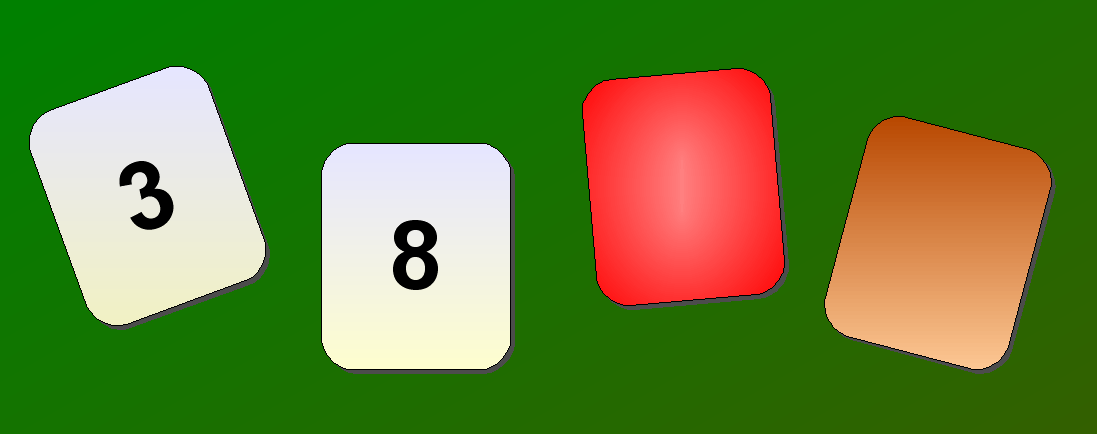
Example of the Wason selection task

The Wason selection task provides evidence for the matching bias. The test is designed as a measure of a person's logical thinking ability. Performance on the Wason Selection Task is sensitive to the content and context with which it is presented. If you introduce a negative component into the conditional statement of the Wason Selection Task, e.g. 'If there is an A one side of the card then there is not a 3 on the other side', there is a strong tendency to choose cards that match the items in the negative condition to test, regardless of their logical status. Changing the test to be a test of following rules rather than truth and falsity is another condition where the participants will ignore the logic because they will simply follow the rule, e.g. changing the test to be a test of a police officer looking for underaged drinkers. The original task is more difficult because it requires explicit and abstract logical thought from System 2, and the police officer test is cued by relevant prior knowledge from System 1.

Studies have shown that you can train people to inhibit matching bias which provides neuropsychological evidence for the dual-process theory of reasoning. When you compare trials before and after the training there is evidence for a forward shift in activated brain area. Pre-test results showed activation in locations along the ventral pathway and post-test results showed activation around the ventro-medial prefrontal cortex and anterior cingulate. Matching bias has also been shown to generalise to syllogistic reasoning.

=== Evolution ===
Dual-process theorists claim that System 2, a general purpose reasoning system, evolved late and worked alongside the older autonomous sub-systems of System 1. The success of Homo sapiens lends evidence to their higher cognitive abilities above other hominids. Mithen theorizes that the increase in cognitive ability occurred 50,000 years ago when representational art, imagery, and the design of tools and artefacts are first documented. She hypothesizes that this change was due to the adaptation of System 2.

Most evolutionary psychologists do not agree with dual-process theorists. They claim that the mind is modular, and domain-specific, thus they disagree with the theory of the general reasoning ability of System 2. They have difficulty agreeing that there are two distinct ways of reasoning and that one is evolutionarily old, and the other is new. To ease this discomfort, the theory is that once System 2 evolved, it became a 'long leash' system without much genetic control which allowed humans to pursue their individual goals.

=== Issues with the dual-process account of reasoning ===
The dual-process account of reasoning is an old theory, as noted above. But according to Evans it has adapted itself from the old, logicist paradigm, to the new theories that apply to other kinds of reasoning as well. Evans outlined 5 "fallacies":

1. All dual-process theories are essentially the same. There is a tendency to assume all theories that propose two modes or styles of thinking are related and so they end up all lumped under the umbrella term of "dual-process theories".
2. There are just two systems underlying System 1 and System 2 processing. There are clearly more than just two cognitive systems underlying people's performance on dual-processing tasks. Hence the change to theorizing that processing is done in two minds that have different evolutionary histories and that each have multiple sub-systems.
3. System 1 processes are responsible for cognitive biases; System 2 processes are responsible for normatively correct responding. Both System 1 and System 2 processing can lead to normative answers and both can involve cognitive biases.
4. System 1 processing is contextualised while System 2 processing is abstract. Recent research has found that beliefs and context can influence System 2 processing as well as System 1.
5. Fast processing indicates the use of System 1 rather than System 2 processes. Just because a processing is fast does not mean it is done by System 1. Experience and different heuristics can influence System 2 processing to go faster.

Another argument against dual-process accounts for reasoning which was outlined by Osman is that the proposed dichotomy of System 1 and System 2 does not adequately accommodate the range of processes accomplished. Moshman proposed that there should be four possible types of processing as opposed to two. They would be implicit heuristic processing, implicit rule-based processing, explicit heuristic processing, and explicit rule-based processing.
Another fine-grained division is as follows: implicit action-centered processes, implicit non-action-centered processes, explicit action-centered processes, and explicit non-action-centered processes (that is, a four-way division reflecting both the implicit-explicit distinction and the procedural-declarative distinction).

In response to the question as to whether there are dichotomous processing types, many have instead proposed a single-system framework which incorporates a continuum between implicit and explicit processes.

== Alternative model ==
The dynamic graded continuum (DGC), originally proposed by Cleeremans and Jiménez is an alternative single system framework to the dual-process account of reasoning. It has not been accepted as better than the dual-process theory; it is instead usually used as a comparison with which one can evaluate the dual-process model. The DGC proposes that differences in representation generate variation in forms of reasoning without assuming a multiple system framework. It describes how graded properties of the representations that are generated while reasoning result in the different types of reasoning. It separates terms like implicit and automatic processing where the dual-process model uses the terms interchangeably to refer to the whole of System 1. Instead the DGC uses a continuum of reasoning that moves from implicit, to explicit, to automatic.

== Fuzzy-trace theory ==
According to Charles Brainerd and Valerie Reyna's fuzzy-trace theory of memory and reasoning, people have two memory representations: verbatim and gist. Verbatim is memory for surface information (e.g. the words in this sentence) whereas gist is memory for semantic information (e.g. the meaning of this sentence).

This dual process theory posits that we encode, store, retrieve, and forget the information in these two traces of memory separately and completely independently of each other. Furthermore, the two memory traces decay at different rates: verbatim decays quickly, while gist lasts longer.

In terms of reasoning, fuzzy-trace theory posits that as we mature, we increasingly rely more on gist information over verbatim information. Evidence for this lies in framing experiments where framing effects become stronger when verbatim information (percentages) are replaced with gist descriptions. Other experiments rule out predictions of prospect theory (extended and original) as well as other current theories of judgment and decision making.

== In artificial intelligence ==
The principles of dual process theory have been increasingly applied to enhance the reasoning capabilities and efficiency of large language models (LLMs). Researchers have proposed a taxonomy for LLM reasoning that distinguishes between "fast thinking," direct, immediate response generation, and "slow thinking," which involves deliberate, multi-step processes such as chain-of-thought prompting, "tool calls" for e.g. retrieval-augmented generation, and intermediate verification. This framework has been extended to include "tool-augmented thinking," where models autonomously decide to bypass internal reasoning in favor of external tools like search engines or calculators to ensure factual precision. Furthermore, the integration of these systems is critical for real-time human-AI collaboration; for instance, the "DPT-Agent" framework utilizes a System 1 component based on finite-state machines for immediate, low-latency actions, while a System 2 component handles complex intentions and asynchronous reflection to adapt to dynamic human strategies.

== See also ==
- Automatic and controlled processes – Categories of cognitive processing
- Cognitive inhibition – Ability to tune out irrelevant stimuli
- Dual process model of coping – Model for coping with grief
- Dual process theory (moral psychology) – Theory of human moral judgment
- Opponent-process theory – Psychological and neurological model
