= Jonathan St B. T. Evans =

British psychologist

- Born: 30 June 1948 (age 78)
- Other name: Jonathan Evans
- Education: University College London
- Known for: Dual process theory
- Scientific career
- Fields: Cognitive psychology
- Workplaces: University College London; University of Plymouth
- Thesis: Deductive reasoning and linguistic usage (with special reference to negation)
- Doctoral advisor: Peter Cathcart Wason
- Website: Official website

Jonathan St B. T. Evans (born 30 June 1948) is a British cognitive psychologist, currently Emeritus Professor of Psychology at the University of Plymouth. In 1975, with Peter Wason, Evans proposed one of the first dual-process theories of reasoning, an idea later developed and popularized by Daniel Kahneman. In a 2011 Festschrift, Evans' peers described him as "one of the most influential figures in the psychology of human reasoning".

== Early life and career ==
Evans began his academic career studying psychology (with a philosophy minor) at University College London in 1966, graduating in 1969 with a first-class honours degree. The same year, he began a Ph.D. on human inference titled "Deductive reasoning and linguistic usage (with special reference to negation)", supervised by Peter Cathcart Wason, which he completed in 1972. He published his first scientific paper, an early account of statistical data analysis by a computer program, in 1971. He spent the next three years at what is now London Metropolitan University.

In 1974, Evans relocated to Plymouth University, where he has worked ever since. He became Professor of Cognitive Psychology in 1985, Director of the Centre for Thinking and Language in 1998, and Head of the School of Psychology in 2005. He became Emeritus Professor in 2009.

== Research interests ==
Evans has worked on all aspects of thinking and reasoning, but is best known for his work on dual-process theories of cognition, originally outlined in a 1975 paper titled "Dual Processes in Reasoning?", co-authored with Peter Wason, and published in the journal Cognition. He is "widely considered the godfather of the standard dual process model that has come to dominate the field", an idea later popularized by Malcolm Gladwell, in Blink: The Power of Thinking Without Thinking, and Daniel Kahneman, in Thinking Fast and Slow. Evans' work combines experimental research and theoretical analysis and also covers human rationality, deductive reasoning, decision making and judgements, conditional reasoning, and the study of heuristics and biases.

Evans helped to establish the journal Thinking & Reasoning and was its editor from 1995 to 2011; he was a member of the editorial board of Psychological Review from 2009 to 2014.

== Selected publications ==
=== Books ===
- Jonathan St B. T. Evans (2010). Thinking Twice: Two minds in one brain. OUP Oxford. ISBN 978-0-19-954729-6.
- — (2013). The Psychology of Deductive Reasoning (Psychology Revivals). Psychology Press. ISBN 978-1-317-82046-8.
- — (2013). Reasoning, Rationality and Dual Processes: Selected works of Jonathan St B.T. Evans. Psychology Press. ISBN 978-1-134-61021-1.
- — (2015). How to Be a Researcher: A strategic guide for academic success. Routledge. ISBN 978-1-317-42260-0.
- — (2017). Thinking and Reasoning: A Very Short Introduction. Oxford University Press. ISBN 978-0-19-878725-9. OCLC 1006485276.
- — (2019). Hypothetical Thinking: Dual Processes in Reasoning and Judgement. Psychology Press. ISBN 978-1-00-076868-8.

==== Collaborations ====
- Jonathan St. B. T. Evans; Stephen E. Newstead; Ruth M. J. Byrne (1993). Human Reasoning: The Psychology of Deduction. Psychology Press. ISBN 978-0-86377-314-3.
- Peter Cathcart Wason; Stephen E. Newstead; Jonathan St. B. T. Evans (1995). Perspectives on Thinking and Reasoning: Essays in Honour of Peter Wason. Psychology Press. ISBN 978-0-86377-358-7.
- Jonathan St. B. T. Evans; David E Over (2004). If: Supposition, Pragmatics, and Dual Processes. Oxford University Press. ISBN 978-0-19-852513-4.
- Jonathan St. B. T. Evans; Keith Frankish (2009). In Two Minds: Dual Processes and Beyond. Oxford University Press. ISBN 978-0-19-923016-7.
- Jonathan St. B.T. Evans; David E. Over (2013). Rationality and Reasoning. Psychology Press. ISBN 978-1-135-47230-6.

=== Articles ===
- Wason, P.C.; Evans, J. St B.T. (January 1974). "Dual processes in reasoning?". Cognition. 3 (2): 141–154. doi:10.1016/0010-0277(74)90017-1. ISSN 0010-0277. S2CID 17184015.
- Evans, Jonathan St B. T. (November 1984). "Heuristic and analytic processes in reasoning". British Journal of Psychology. 75 (4): 451–468. doi:10.1111/j.2044-8295.1984.tb01915.x. ISSN 0007-1269.
- — (October 2003). "In two minds: dual-process accounts of reasoning". Trends in Cognitive Sciences. 7 (10): 454–459. doi:10.1016/j.tics.2003.08.012. ISSN 1364-6613. PMID 14550493. S2CID 12508462.
- — (18 April 2005). "8. Deductive reasoning". In Morrison, Robert (ed.). The Cambridge Handbook of Thinking and Reasoning. Cambridge University Press. ISBN 978-0-521-82417-0.
- — (1 January 2008). "Dual-Processing Accounts of Reasoning, Judgment, and Social Cognition". Annual Review of Psychology. 59 (1): 255–278. doi:10.1146/annurev.psych.59.103006.093629. eISSN 1545-2085. ISSN 0066-4308. PMID 18154502. S2CID 12246493.
- — (2016). "A brief history of the Wason selection task". In Galbraith, Neil; Lucas, Erica; Over, David (eds.). The Thinking Mind: A Festschrift for Ken Manktelow. Psychology Press. doi:10.4324/9781315676074. ISBN 978-1-317-38408-3.
- — (October 2016). "Reasoning, Biases and Dual Processes: The Lasting Impact of Wason (1960)". Quarterly Journal of Experimental Psychology. 69 (10): 2076–2092. doi:10.1080/17470218.2014.914547. eISSN 1747-0226. ISSN 1747-0218. PMID 25158629. S2CID 21583387.
