= Mauro Montalbetti =

Italian composer

Mauro Montalbetti (born 11 October 1969 in Brescia, Italy) is an Italian composer. He studied by Antonio Giacometti and his opera Lies and Sorrow won the 2006 international J. J. Fux Opera Prize.

== Other prizes ==
- 2005 Composition Prize city of Cesena, Italy: 1st prize
- 2004 Scuola di Musica di Fiesele Opera Prize, Firenze, Italy: 1st prize
- 2000 Britten on the Bay, New York: 3rd prize
- 1999 Gaudeamus Prize, Amsterdam, the Netherlands: Finalist
- 1990 Premio Evangelisti, Rome, Italy: Finalist
- 1988 Premio Bucchi, Rome, Italy: Special Mention D juniores
