= Mario Montalbetti =

Peruvian academic (born 1953)

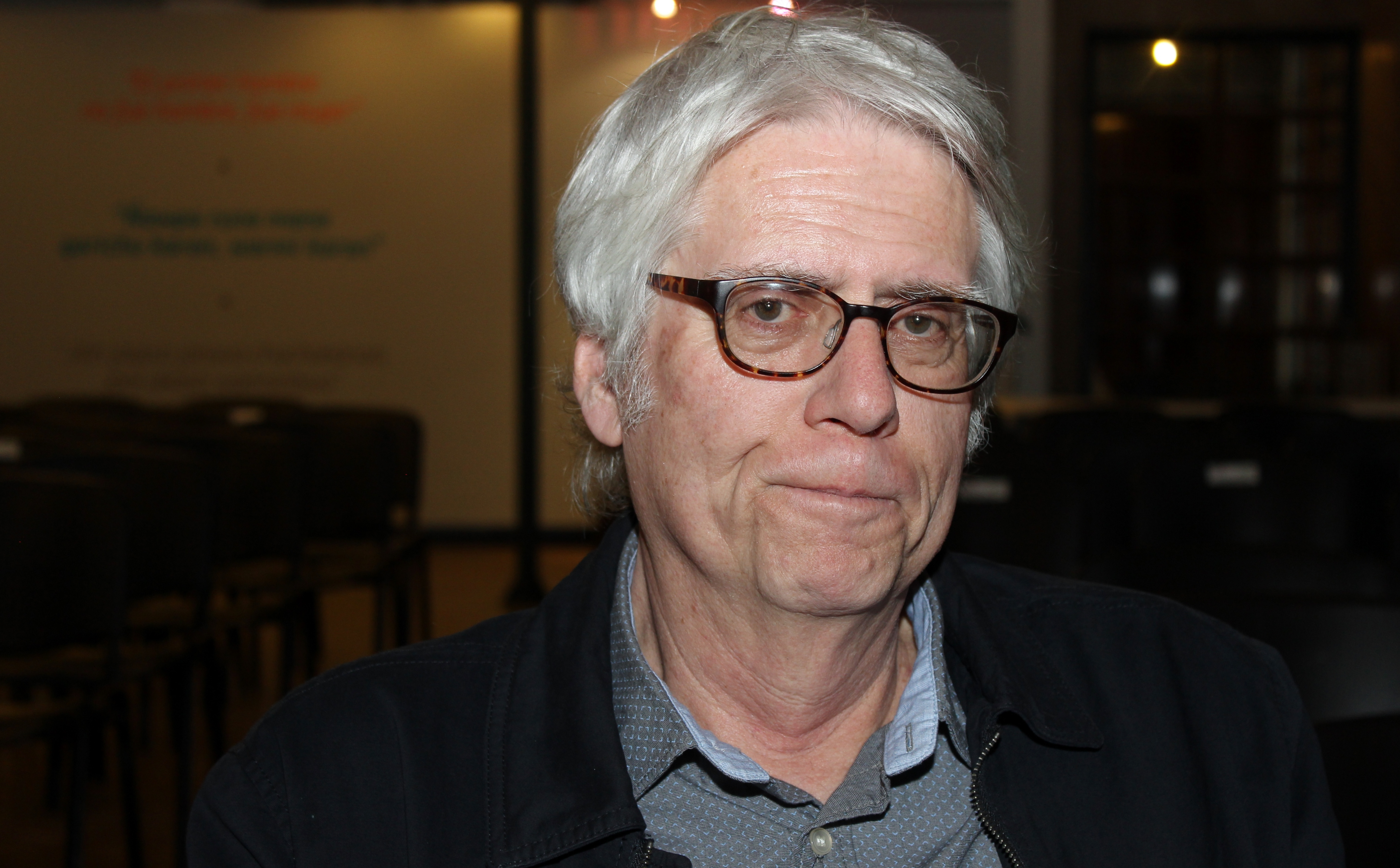
Mario Montalbetti in 2018

Mario Manuel Bartolo Montalbetti Solari (born 1953 in Callao) is a Peruvian poet and syntactician and a professor of linguistics within the Department of Linguistics at the University of Arizona.

== Career ==
Mario Montalbetti studied literature in Pontificia Universidad Católica del Perú. He holds a PhD in linguistics from the Massachusetts Institute of Technology. As of 2009, he holds the title of Associate Professor in the Department of Spanish and Portuguese at the University of Arizona and is also a member of the faculty of the Second Language Acquisition and Teaching (SLAT) Program and the Center for Latin American Studies. His research interests include theoretical linguistics and Spanish morphology and syntax.

== Publications ==
- Montalbetti, Mario (1982). "Three ways to get tough". In K. Tuite; R. Schneider; R. Chametzky (eds.). Papers from the Eighteenth Regional Meeting of the Chicago Linguistic Society. University of Chicago: Chicago Linguistic Society. pp. 348–366.
- Montalbetti, Mario; Mamuro Saito (1983). "On certain (tough) differences between Spanish and English". In P. Sells; C. Jones (eds.). Proceedings of the Thirteenth Annual Meeting of the North East Linguistics Conference. Amherst, Mass.: GLSA publications. pp. 191–198.
- Montalbetti, Mario (1984). After binding: On the interpretation of pronouns (Thesis). Massachusetts Institute of Technology. hdl:1721.1/15222.
- Montalbetti, Mario; Kenneth Wexler (1985). "Binding is linking". WCCFL. 4: 228–246.
- Montalbetti, Mario; O. Jaeggli & C. Silva-Corvalán (eds.) (1986). "How pro is it?". Studies in Romance linguistics. Dordrecht: Foris. pp. 137–152.
- Montalbetti, Mario (1997). Fin desierto y otros poemas. Lima, Perú: Hueso Húmero ediciones.
- Montalbetti, Mario (2002). Llantos elíseos. Dordrecht: Foris. ISBN 9972-852-05-9.

== See also ==
- Literature of Peru
- Montalbetti sentence
