= THOG problem =

The THOG problem is one of cognitive psychologist Peter Wason's logic puzzles, constructed to show some of the weaknesses in human thinking.

You are shown four symbols

1. a black square
2. a white square
3. a black circle
4. a white circle

and told by the experimenter "I have picked one colour (black or white) and one shape (square or circle). A symbol that possesses exactly one, but not both, of the properties I have picked, is called a THOG. The black square is a THOG. For each of the other symbols, are they a) definitely a THOG, b) undecidable, or c) definitely not a THOG?"

Presented in this form, the task is quite difficult, because much information must be held in working memory at the same time.

== Solution 1 (Analysis of symbol properties) ==
The chosen symbol of the experimenter is not a black square, since it shares both properties with the black square, and so the black square would not be a THOG.

The chosen symbol of the experimenter is not a white circle, since it shares 0 properties with the black square, and so the black square would not be a THOG.

So the experimenter could have chosen either a black circle or a white square. As the colours and shapes of these two possibilities are opposites, it means:

1. Any symbol that shares exactly one property with one of the possibilities must necessarily share exactly one property with the other possibility. (So we can conclude that both the black square and the white circle are definitely THOGs.)
2. Any symbol that shares both properties with one of the possibilities must necessarily share 0 properties with the other possibility (and vice versa). (So we can conclude that both the black circle and the white square are definitely not THOGs.)

== Solution 2 (Case Analysis of the Experimenter's choice) ==
This solution analyzes the four possible hidden choices of the experimenter.

Solution to THOG
Experimenter's hidden choice	Relation to black square	relation to white square	relation to black circle	relation to white circle	Note
Black square	not a THOG	THOG	THOG	not a THOG	Impossible choice, since the black square is not a THOG
White square	THOG	not a THOG	not a THOG	THOG	
Black circle	THOG	not a THOG	not a THOG	THOG	
White circle	not a THOG	THOG	THOG	not a THOG	Impossible choice, since the black square is not a THOG

From the table we see that the only valid choice for the experimenter are the white square or the black circle. In both of those rows, all of the information is the same.

So the conclusions are:

1. The black square is definitely a THOG
2. The white square is definitely not a THOG
3. The black circle is definitely not a THOG
4. The white circle is definitely a THOG
