= Peter Cathcart Wason =

English psychologist (1924–2003)

Peter Wason
- Born: Peter Cathcart Wason; 22 April 1924; Bath, Somerset, England
- Died: 17 April 2003 (aged 78); Wallingford, Oxfordshire, England
- Resting place: Highgate Cemetery
- Education: Oxford University; University College London
- Known for: Psychology of reasoning
- Relatives: Sydney Rigby Wason (uncle)
- Scientific career
- Fields: Psychology
- Workplaces: University of Aberdeen; University College, London
- Doctoral students: Philip Johnson-Laird; Jonathan St B. T. Evans

Peter Cathcart Wason (/ˈweɪsən/; 22 April 1924 – 17 April 2003) was an English cognitive psychologist at University College London, who pioneered the psychology of reasoning. He sought to explain why people consistently commit logical errors. He designed problems and tests to demonstrate these behaviours, such as the Wason selection task, the THOG problem and the 2-4-6 problem. He also coined the term "confirmation bias" to describe the tendency for people to immediately favor information that validates their preconceptions, hypotheses and personal beliefs regardless of whether they are true or not.

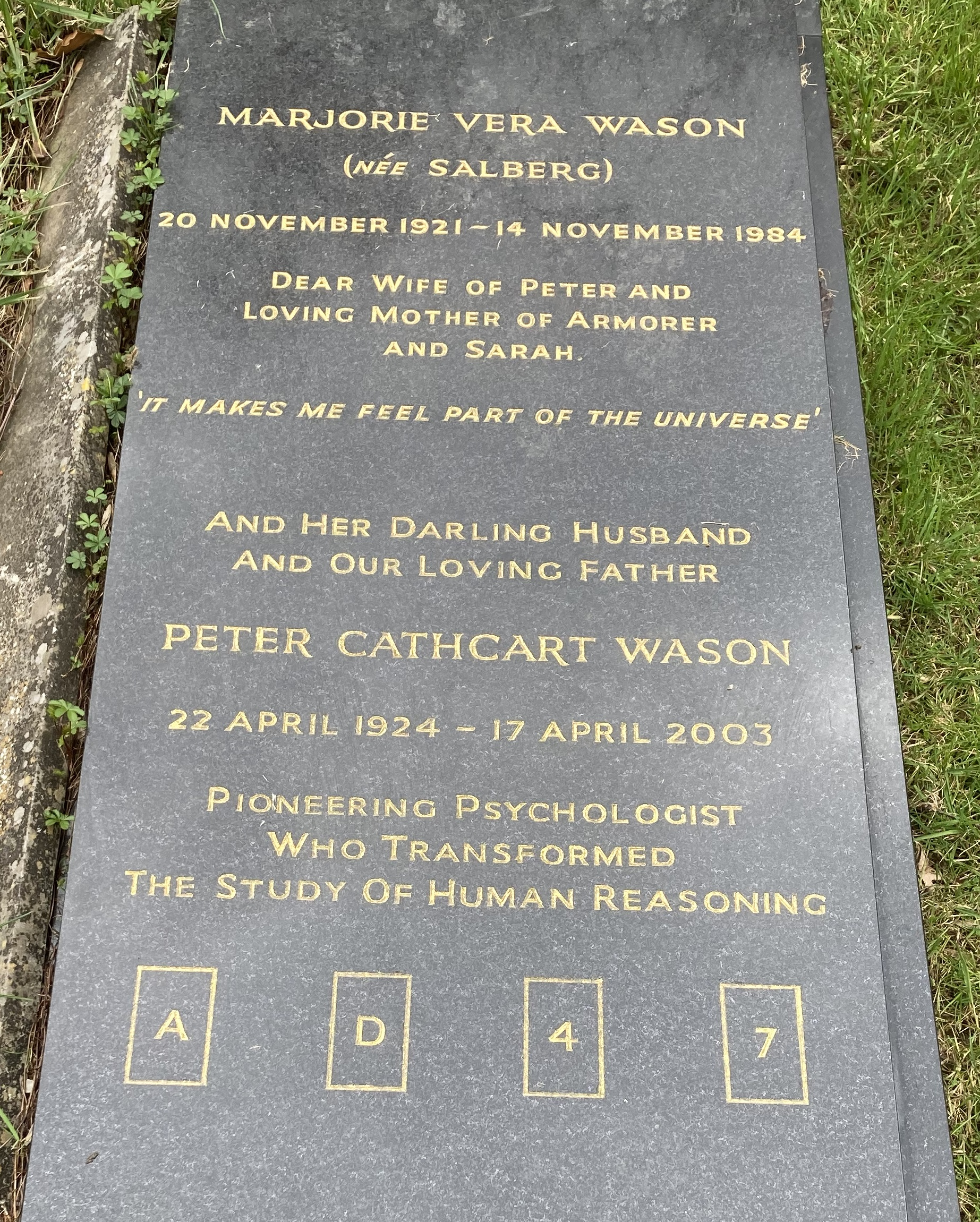
Grave of Peter Cathcart Wason in Highgate Cemetery (east side)

== Personal life ==
Wason was born in Bath, Somerset, on 22 April 1924, and died at age 78 in Wallingford, Oxfordshire, on 17 April 2003. Peter Wason was the grandson of Eugene Wason, and the son of Eugene Monier and Kathleen (Woodhouse) Wason. Wason married Marjorie Vera Salberg in 1951, and the couple had two children, Armorer and Sarah. His uncle was Lieutenant General Sydney Rigby Wason.

Peter Wason endured his schooling, which was marked by consistent failure. With the beginning of World War II, Wason completed officer training at Sandhurst, and then served as a liaison officer for the 8th Armoured Brigade, by then an independent brigade. Wason returned home in 1945, having been released from his duties as an officer due to extreme injuries. Wason then studied English at Oxford University in 1948, and became a lecturer at the University of Aberdeen. Disenchanted with teaching English, Wason returned to Oxford University to obtain a master's degree in psychology in 1953, and then a doctorate in 1956 from University College London. He remained teaching at University College London until his retirement in the early 1980s.

== Early studies ==
Much of Peter Wason's first areas of experimentation was not in the field of psychology of reasoning, but language and psycholinguistics. Wason and Jones performed an experiment in which subjects were asked to evaluate numerical statements, such as "7 is even" and "9 is not odd", and state whether the statement is true or false. The results revealed that affirmative assertions were evaluated faster as true rather than false, but evaluation of negative assertions occurred faster as false rather than true. From these results, Wason came to the conclusion that negatives are used in daily discourse to correct common misconceptions. An example of this usage would be "The chair is not here". Wason continued to explore and experiment in the field of psycholinguistics. With Susan Carey at the Harvard Center for Cognitive Studies, Wason found that context affects comprehension of an utterance, measured in time taken to respond. Participants were likely to respond more quickly to the statement "Circle number 4 is not blue" in a context in which all of the other circles were red. Wason came to the conclusion context affects comprehension.

== Psychology of reasoning ==
Before the creation of psychology of reasoning, it was a commonly held belief that humans reasoned by logical analysis. Wason argued against this "logicism", saying that humans are unable to reason, and quite frequently fall prey to biases. Wason thought many of the things in his life were inconsistent and therefore unreasonable. When he designed his experiments, Wason's goal was to examine the illogical nature of humans. Wason also wanted to look further into the confirmation bias, the tendency to strive toward proving one's hypothesis instead of disproving it.

=== Wason and the 2-4-6 Task ===
In 1960 Wason developed the first of many tasks he would devise to reveal the failures of human reasoning. The "2-4-6" task was the first experiment that showed people to be illogical and irrational. In this study, subjects were told that the experimenter had a rule in mind that only applied to sets of threes. The "2-4-6" rule the experimenter had in mind was "any ascending sequence". In most cases, subjects not only formed hypotheses that were more specific than necessary, but they also only tested positive examples of their hypothesis. Wason was surprised by the large number of subjects who failed to get the task correct. The subjects failed to test instances inconsistent with their own hypothesis, which further supported Wason's hypothesis of confirmation bias.

=== The Four-Card Task ===
Wason created the Selection Task, also known as the 4-card task, in 1966. In this task, participants were exposed to four cards on a table, and given a rule by the experimenter. The participants were then told to choose just cards to determine whether the rule given to them by the experimenter was true or false. As Wason expected, a majority of participants failed to answer the question correctly. Only ten percent of participants solved this task correctly. The confirmation bias played a large part in this result, as participants usually chose cards to confirm their hypothesis, instead of eliminating it.

=== THOG Task ===
Wason devised yet another task, called the THOG task, to further his studies in psychology of reasoning. Participants were shown cards with a white diamond, a black diamond, a white circle, and a black circle. They were then given a rule, and instructed to choose which of the cards would be a THOG, which were not, and which could not be classified. The THOG task required subjects to carry out a combinational analysis, a feat an adult should be able to accomplish, using reason and logic. However, half of the participants failed to solve the problem correctly.

=== Wason verbal illusion ===
In 1979 Wason, with Shuli Reich, identified what became known as the Wason verbal illusion. The illusion shows that people can systematically misinterpret certain grammatically complex sentences, such as "No head injury is too trivial to be ignored." Although the literal meaning implies that all head injuries should be ignored, most readers interpret it to mean the opposite—that all head injuries deserve attention. Wason and Reich demonstrated that this reversal arises from pragmatic expectations and world knowledge overriding syntactic analysis, revealing limits in human sentence processing and the tendency to favor plausible over literal interpretations.

== Approach to experimentation ==
Peter Wason took a rather unconventional approach to his studies. When running experiments, he took a more active approach. Although he had some assistants, he insisted on being present when experiments were run, so he could actively watch the behaviour of the subjects throughout the process. It is also said that Wason infused a clinical psychology atmosphere into his study by asking his subjects how they felt about the experiment itself, as well as the results delivered. These evaluations were recorded and placed in his papers, giving them a more personal and unique aspect than many other academic papers of the time. Wason's goal was to discover new psychological phenomena and new aspects of human behaviour, and not only to test his own hypotheses.

== Publications ==
Wason wrote the following books:

- Thinking and Reasoning, (co-edited with P N Johnson-Laird, 1968)
- Psychology of Reasoning: Structure and Content, (with P N Johnson-Laird, 1972)
- Thinking: Readings in Cognitive Science, (co-edited with P N Johnson-Laird, 1977)
- The Psychology of Chess, (with William Hartston, 1983).
