= Wason selection task =

Test in the study of deductive reasoning

Each card has a number on one side and color on the other. Which card or cards must be turned over to test the idea that if a card shows an even number on one face, then its opposite face is blue?

In psychology, the Wason selection task (or four-card problem) is a logic puzzle devised by Peter Cathcart Wason in 1966. It is one of the most famous tasks in the study of deductive reasoning. An example of the puzzle is:

You are shown a set of four cards placed on a table, each of which has a number on one side and a color on the other. The visible faces of the cards show 3, 8, blue and red. Which card(s) must you turn over in order to test that if a card shows an even number on one face, then its opposite face is blue?

A response that identifies a card that need not be inverted, or that fails to identify a card that needs to be inverted, is incorrect. The original task dealt with numbers (even, odd) and letters (vowels, consonants).

The test is of special interest because people have a hard time solving it in most scenarios but can usually solve it correctly in certain contexts. In particular, researchers have found that the puzzle is readily solved when the imagined context is policing a social rule.

== Solution ==
The correct response is to turn over the 8 card and the red card.

The rule was "If the card shows an even number on one face, then its opposite face is blue." Only a card with both an even number on one face and something other than blue on the other face can invalidate this rule:

- If the 3 card is blue (or red), that doesn't violate the rule. The rule makes no claims about odd numbers. (Denying the antecedent)
- If the 8 card is not blue, it violates the rule. (Modus ponens)
- If the blue card is odd (or even), that doesn't violate the rule. The blue color is not exclusive to even numbers. (Affirming the consequent)
- If the red card is even, it violates the rule. (Modus tollens)

=== Use of logic ===
The interpretation of "if" here is that of the material conditional in classical logic, so this problem can be solved by choosing the cards using modus ponens (all even cards must be checked to ensure they are blue) and modus tollens (all non-blue cards must be checked to ensure they are non-even).

One experiment revolving around the Wason four card problem found many influences on people's selection in this task experiment that were not based on logic. The non-logical inferences made by the participants from this experiment demonstrate the possibility and structure of extra-logical reasoning mechanisms.

Alternatively, one might solve the problem by using another reference to zeroth-order logic. In classical propositional logic, the material conditional is false if and only if its antecedent is true and its consequent is false. As an implication of this, two cases need to be inspected in the selection task to check whether we are dealing with a false conditional:

- The case in which the antecedent is true (the even card), to examine whether the consequent is false (the opposite face is not blue).
- The case in which the consequent is false (the red card), to study whether the antecedent is true (the opposite face is even).

== Explanations of performance on the task ==
In Wason's study, not even 10% of subjects found the correct solution, which for the specific criteria of this problem, would be the 8 card and the red card. This result was replicated in 1993. The poor success rate of this selection experiment may be explained by its lack of relevant significance. If this task was reframed, however, empirical evidence has shown an increase in logical responses.

Some authors have argued that participants do not read "if... then..." as the material conditional, since the natural language conditional is not the material conditional. (See also the paradoxes of the material conditional for more information.) However one interesting feature of the task is how participants react when the classical logic solution is explained:

A psychologist, not very well disposed toward logic, once confessed to me that despite all problems in short-term inferences like the Wason Card Task, there was also the undeniable fact that he had never met an experimental subject who did not understand the logical solution when it was explained to him, and then agreed that it was correct.

Wason also ascribes participants' errors on this selection task due to confirmation bias. Confirmation bias compels people to seek the cards which confirm the rule; meanwhile, they overlook the main purpose of the experiment, which is to purposefully choose the cards that potentially disconfirm the rule.

=== Policing social rules ===
As of 1983, experimenters had identified that success on the Wason selection task was highly context-dependent, but there was no theoretical explanation for which contexts elicited mostly correct responses and which ones elicited mostly incorrect responses.

Each card has an age on one side and a drink on the other. Which card(s) must be turned over to test the idea that if you are drinking alcohol, then you must be over 18?

Evolutionary psychologists Leda Cosmides and John Tooby (1992) identified that the selection task tends to produce the "correct" response when presented in a context of social relations. For example, if the rule used is "If you are drinking alcohol, then you must be over 18" or in other words "If you are not over 18, then you must not drink alcohol", and the cards have an age on one side and beverage on the other, e.g., "16", "drinking beer", "25", "drinking soda", most people have no difficulty in selecting the correct cards ("16” and "drinking beer"). In a series of experiments in different contexts, subjects demonstrated consistent superior performance when asked to police a social rule involving a benefit that was only legitimately available to someone who had qualified for that benefit. Cosmides and Tooby argued that experimenters have ruled out alternative explanations, such as that people learn the rules of social exchange through practice and find it easier to apply these familiar rules than less-familiar rules.

According to Cosmides and Tooby, this experimental evidence supports the hypothesis that a Wason task proves to be easier if the rule to be tested is one of social exchange (in order to receive benefit X you need to fulfill condition Y) and the subject is asked to police the rule, but is more difficult otherwise. They argued that such a distinction, if empirically borne out, would support the contention of evolutionary psychologists that human reasoning is governed by context-sensitive mechanisms that have evolved, through natural selection, to solve specific problems of social interaction, rather than context-free, general-purpose mechanisms. In this case, the module is described as a specialized cheater-detection module.

==== Evaluation of social relations hypothesis ====
Davies et al. (1995) have argued that Cosmides and Tooby's argument in favor of context-sensitive, domain-specific reasoning mechanisms as opposed to general-purpose reasoning mechanisms is theoretically incoherent and inferentially unjustified. Von Sydow (2006) has argued that we have to distinguish deontic and descriptive conditionals, but that the logic of testing deontic conditionals is more systematic (see Beller, 2001) and depend on one's goals (see Sperber & Girotto, 2002). However, in response to Kanazawa (2010), Kaufman et al. (2011) gave 112 subjects a 70-item computerized version of the contextualized Wason card-selection task proposed by Cosmides and Tooby (1992) and found instead that "performance on non-arbitrary, evolutionarily familiar problems is more strongly related to general intelligence than performance on arbitrary, evolutionarily novel problems", and writing for Psychology Today, Kaufman concluded instead that "It seems that general intelligence is very much compatible with evolutionary psychology."

== See also ==
- Cognition
- Cognitive reflection test
- Confirmation bias
- Evolution of human intelligence
- Logic
- Necessary and sufficient conditions
- Psychology of reasoning
