= Indicative conditional =

Natural-language "if" sentences about what may be the case

An indicative conditional is a natural-language conditional sentence (an "if" sentence) used to talk about what may actually be the case, as in: "If Leona is at home, she isn't in Paris." Indicatives are commonly contrasted with counterfactual conditionals, which typically bear special grammatical marking (e.g., "would have") and are used to discuss ways things might have been but are not.

Indicative conditionals are central in philosophy of language, philosophical logic (especially conditional logic), and linguistics. Debates concern (i) what semantic value, if any, such conditionals have; (ii) how their contribution composes with surrounding material; and (iii) how competing accounts explain observed patterns of assertion, reasoning, and embedding. Prominent proposals include truth-functional analyses, pragmatics-augmented accounts, probabilistic ("suppositional") approaches, possible-worlds semantics, and restrictor treatments of if.

== Scope and classification ==
Many authors reserve "indicative" for conditionals whose matrix clause is in the indicative mood (e.g., with is, will), in contrast to counterfactuals (with would). Others argue that some "future-open" indicatives pattern more like counterfactuals. Despite disagreements in classification, there is broad consensus that everyday "if A, B" claims used to guide belief and action are a distinctive target for theory.

== Competing theories ==
=== Material conditional and its limitations ===
Early formal work identified natural-language indicatives with the truth-functional material conditional: "If A then B" is false only in the case A ∧ ¬B and otherwise true (equivalently ¬A ∨ B). This analysis validates familiar inferences (e.g., modus ponens), but faces well-known "paradoxes of material implication": with a true consequent (B) or false antecedent (A), any "if A, B" comes out true—even when A and B are intuitively unrelated.

==== Gricean and assertability responses ====
A classic response (inspired by H. P. Grice) keeps the material truth conditions but explains everyday resistance via pragmatics: speakers are expected to make the strongest, most informative appropriate assertion; when one knows ¬A, asserting "If A, B" can be true yet misleading. Others (notably Jackson) supplement material truth with special rules of assertability keyed to how robustly one would continue to accept B upon learning A (often cashed out as high conditional probability P(B|A)). Critics argue that many tensions arise at the level of belief and probability, not merely assertion norms.

=== Suppositional / probabilistic theories ===
The Ramsey test holds that to assess "if A, B" one should suppose A and then evaluate B under that supposition. Developed by Ernest W. Adams, the suppositional view takes the degree of belief in "if A, B" to be P(B|A) and offers a probabilistic account of valid inference (arguments are "good" when they preserve or suitably constrain probability). This explains why many everyday inferences (e.g., modus tollens with high but sub-certain premises) can be risky, and why rules like strengthening the antecedent and transitivity often fail in practice.

A challenge for propositional semantics is Lewis's "triviality" results: in general there is no proposition ⟦A⇒B⟧ whose probability always equals P(B|A). This pressures the idea that indicative conditionals are standard truth-evaluable propositions with classical truth conditions.

=== Possible-worlds and strict-style accounts ===
Robert Stalnaker proposed that "if A, B" is true at a world w just in case B holds at the contextually nearest (most similar) A-world to w; for indicatives, conversational context constrains which worlds count as live possibilities. Such accounts vindicate many Adams-style patterns but face issues about similarity metrics, uniqueness of nearest worlds, and probabilistic judgments (e.g., lottery-like "short straw" cases). Context-dependent strict conditional views and the influential "if as a restrictor of modals" approach (Kratzer) treat if not as a binary connective but as narrowing the domain of a modal/quantifier; "bare" conditionals are often analyzed as containing an unpronounced epistemic necessity operator.

=== Dynamic, multidimensional, and related semantics ===
To reconcile probabilistic behavior with compositional embedding, several frameworks treat conditionals as non-classical contents. One line (de Finetti; later, Jeffrey, van Fraassen) models "if A, B" as a three-valued or random-variable-like object whose expectation equals P(B|A); another (Bradley) represents conditionals via ordered pairs/tuples of worlds encoding both the actual state and the "potential A-state," enabling truth conditions for many embeddings while preserving the P(B|A) link.

=== Embedding and notable problems ===
Indicatives embedded under negation, disjunction, or in antecedents raise hard questions for all theories (e.g., the import–export principle relating "if A and B, C" to "if A, if B, C"). Vann McGee's "election" example challenges modus ponens for certain nested indicatives if their readings shift across embeddings; different frameworks diagnose the phenomenon differently (scope/reading shifts vs. probabilistic risk vs. ambiguity).

=== Heuristics vs. semantics ===
Some authors separate our fast, reliable-enough heuristics for evaluating conditionals (Ramsey-Adams suppositional reasoning) from their underlying "semantic" treatment (e.g., material truth conditions that rationalize long-run practice). Tensions remain because material truth values often overstate the probability of conditionals with unlikely antecedents (by P(¬A) + P(A)·P(B|A)).

== Psychology of reasoning ==
Experimental work on indicatives, causal conditionals and counterfactuals finds robust endorsement of modus ponens; rates for modus tollens are variable and context-sensitive, improving under causal or counterfactual formulations and with enriched background knowledge. Probabilistic ("suppositional") accounts have been argued to align closely with observed reasoning patterns, especially where participants condition on the antecedent and assess the likelihood of the consequent.

== See also ==
- Conditional logic
- Counterfactual conditional
- Logical consequence
- Material conditional
- Strict conditional
- Pragmatics
- Conditional probability
