= Restricted =

Restricted may refer to:

- R rating (disambiguation), list of subjects where "R" stands for "Restricted"
- 18 rating, media rating designation sometimes called "Restricted"
- Restricted (country club), historical use of the term in country clubs in the United States
- Restricted airspace, airspace for which air traffic is restricted or prohibited for safety or security concerns
- Restricted area (disambiguation), several uses
- Restricted free agent, a type of free agent in various professional sports
- Restricted list, a roster status in Major League Baseball
- Restricted stock, stock of a company that is not fully transferable
- Restricted (DJ), Australian DJ and record producer.

== See also ==
- Restrict, keyword in the C programming language
- Restriction (disambiguation)
