= Mental model theory of reasoning =

Theory in psychology

The mental model theory of reasoning was developed by Philip Johnson-Laird and Ruth M.J. Byrne. It has been applied to major domains of deductive inference, including relational inferences (spatial and temporal reasoning), propositional inferences (conditional, disjunctive and negation reasoning), quantified inferences (syllogisms), and meta-deductive inferences.

Subsequent research on mental models and reasoning has extended the theory to account for probabilistic inference and counterfactual thinking.

== See also ==
- Psychology of reasoning
