= Conditional logic =

Family of logics for natural-language and counterfactual conditionals

Conditional logic (also: the logic of conditionals) refers to a family of formal systems for reasoning with statements of the form "if A, (then) B". Conditional logics are intended to capture the meaning and patterns of inference associated with natural language conditionals more faithfully than the classical material conditional, which gives rise to well-known paradoxes. Conditional logics are used in philosophical logic, formal semantics of natural language, artificial intelligence, and the psychology of reasoning. They are used to model everyday and scientific reasoning about hypothetical, causal, modal, and counterfactual scenarios.

The material conditional is a truth function, which is always true except when the antecedent is true and the consequent false. Most conditional logics introduce an additional conditional connective (often written $\mathbin{>}$ or, in the context of counterfactuals, $\square\to$) whose truth or acceptability can depend on similarity between possible worlds, on context and background information, or on probabilistic support rather than on a simple two-valued truth table. These systems are designed to validate basic principles such as modus ponens, while restricting or invalidating classical schemas like strengthening the antecedent, transitivity, and contraposition, which are not always correct for ordinary "if ... then ..." sentences. It is common to distinguish between indicative conditionals, which concern open possibilities relative to what is currently known, and counterfactual conditionals, which describe ways things would or might have been contrary to fact. However, many conditional logics treat both of these as variants of a common underlying framework.

A wide range of semantic approaches has been developed for such logics, including three-valued and other many-valued systems that treat conditionals with false antecedents as void, possible worlds and selection function models in the tradition of Stalnaker and Lewis, premise or ordering source semantics, probabilistic and suppositional accounts tying acceptability to conditional probability, and belief revision frameworks based on the Ramsey test. Corresponding proof-theoretic systems range from Chellas's basic logics Ck and CK to stronger systems such as Burgess's B and Lewis's V, VW and VC, or Stalnaker's C2, which validate different structural principles for the conditional connective and are often related by soundness and completeness theorems to the underlying semantic frameworks. Conditional logics are also closely linked to nonmonotonic consequence relations and default reasoning systems, notably the cumulative and preferential systems C and P of Kraus, Lehmann and Magidor, which are widely used in AI to formalize rules with exceptions.

Historically, conditional logic grew out of attempts to refine earlier notions such as C. I. Lewis's strict implication, and the contemporary field is usually traced to Robert Stalnaker's 1968 possible worlds theory of conditionals and David Lewis's subsequent development of variably strict logics for counterfactuals. Later work by Nute, Burgess, Kratzer, Gärdenfors and many others has broadened the landscape, yielding a cluster of interrelated frameworks rather than a single canonical system and connecting the logic of "if ... then ..." with topics such as nonmonotonic logic, belief revision, conditional probability and the pragmatics of assertion, questioning and decision-making.

== Overview ==
Conditional logics form a family of formal systems for reasoning with sentences of the form "if A, (then) B". They aim to explain when such conditionals are acceptable, how they interact with other logical operators, and which arguments involving them should count as valid or rationally compelling. In contrast to the classical material conditional $A \supset B$, most conditional logics build some notion of dependence between antecedent and consequent into their semantics, and allow the validity of inferences with conditionals to be sensitive to context, background information, or normality assumptions.

Rather than a single canonical calculus, conditional logic is now used as an umbrella term for several families of interrelated systems. Prominent traditions include: three-valued and other many-valued logics that treat conditionals with false antecedents as void; possible worlds and selection function logics inspired by Stalnaker and Lewis; premise or ordering source semantics that work with sets of background assumptions; probabilistic and suppositional accounts that tie acceptability to conditional probability; and belief revision and nonmonotonic approaches grounded in the Ramsey test. A common slogan is that to evaluate "if A, then B" one should add A hypothetically to one's information state and ask whether B would then be accepted.

Most authors distinguish between indicative conditionals, which concern open possibilities relative to an information state, and counterfactual conditionals, which describe ways things would or might have been contrary to fact (for example, "If the match had been struck, it would have lit"). Many formal frameworks nevertheless treat these as variants of a common semantic core, parametrized by the kind of modality or background premises involved. This article follows that practice and surveys a range of systems that have been proposed for both indicative and counterfactual readings.

=== Notation ===
The conditional studied by a given conditional logic is here notated with $\mathbin{>}$, for instance $A \mathbin{>} B$ represents "if A, then B". This conditional "corner", not to be confused with the indentically written greater than sign, was the notation used by Robert Stalnaker's paper that started the field (see § History below), and which has been followed in various other reference publications. Some conditional logics have been studied in the specific context of counterfactual conditionals, and in that context, David Lewis's $A \; \square\to B$ notation for counterfactuals (read "if A had been the case, B would have been the case") is also common.

=== Interaction with modality and speech acts ===
In many languages, if-clauses interact closely with overt or covert modal expressions such as must, might, or would. On the influential "restrictor" view, an if-clause does not itself introduce a binary connective, but instead restricts the domain of a following modal or quantificational operator; this helps explain the apparent commutation of conditionals and modals in sentences like "if A, it must be that B" and "it must be that if A, then B".

Dynamic and expressivist accounts build on this idea by treating an indicative or counterfactual conditional as an update on an information state or conversational scoreboard. On such views, incompatibilities between "if A, B" and "if A, might not B" arise because the two updates place conflicting constraints on the same body of shared information. The same machinery extends naturally to conditional questions (if A, will B?) and to conditional imperatives (if A, do B), which are modelled as transformations of inquiry states or decision problems rather than as simple truth evaluations.

In this way, conditional logics are used not only to model the truth conditions of if-sentences, but also to capture their role in conversation, planning and decision, and to connect the semantics of conditionals with the pragmatics of assertion, questioning and commanding.

=== Logical principles and their failure ===
Classical material implication validates a number of principles that look plausible at first sight but seem problematic for ordinary if-sentences. Early work by Adams, Stalnaker and Lewis highlighted counterexamples to strengthening the antecedent (from "if A then C" infer "if A and B then C"), to transitivity (chaining conditionals), and to contraposition (from "if A then B" infer "if not B then not A").

Modern conditional logics typically invalidate at least some of these principles. They also differ with respect to more specific schemas such as:

- Or-to-If (from $A \lor B$ infer $\neg A \mathbin{>} B$);
- Import–export ($A \mathbin{>} (B \mathbin{>} C)$ equivalent to $(A \land B) \mathbin{>} C$);
- Simplification of disjunctive antecedents (from $(A \lor B) \mathbin{>} C$ infer both $A \mathbin{>} C$ and $B \mathbin{>} C$).

The status of these schemata is tied to fine-grained issues about how similarity orderings or selection functions work, how contexts are updated, and how conditionals interact with background premises. For example, variably strict semantics that evaluate conditionals at "closest" antecedent worlds tend to be nonmonotonic on the left: adding extra conditions to the antecedent can shift attention to more remote worlds and thereby defeat an inference. Questions about which schemas to adopt are central to the classification of conditional logics, and help motivate the array of systems (CK, B, V, VC, C2 and others) discussed in later sections.

=== Relation to nonmonotonic reasoning and AI ===
Conditional logics are closely connected to nonmonotonic logics and to AI formalisms for default and defeasible reasoning. Preferential and ranked models for nonmonotonic consequence relations, introduced by Kraus, Lehmann and Magidor, can be understood as abstracting away from the explicit conditional connective and instead working directly with a consequence relation $\vdash_{\!\sim}$ that encodes defaults of the form "normally, if A then B". Their system P of preferential entailment, and the stronger rational system R, correspond to the "flat" fragments of several variably strict conditional logics, including Burgess's system B and Lewis's systems for counterfactuals.

From the perspective of artificial intelligence, these logics support representation and automated reasoning with rules that have exceptions: for example, that birds normally fly, or that a component normally functions unless it is known to be faulty. The correspondence between conditional logics and nonmonotonic consequence relations has been used to transfer results and techniques between the two areas, to design theorem provers for conditional logics, and to apply them in diagnosis, planning and knowledge representation.

== History ==
Early modern logic identified "if A then B" with the material implication true in all cases except when A is true and B false. While attractive for mathematical proof, this leads to the paradoxes of material implication (any true B or false A makes A ⊃ B true) and counterintuitive behavior of negation and denial. Classical analyses also vacuously validate counterfactuals with false antecedents. These issues motivated richer accounts distinguishing indicative conditionals from counterfactual conditionals and modeling the dependency between antecedent and consequent.

Although systems for reasoning with conditionals go back at least to C. I. Lewis's strict implication and related modal logics, the contemporary field of conditional logic is usually traced to Robert Stalnaker's 1968 paper A Theory of Conditionals. Drawing on Ramsey's idea of hypothetically adding the antecedent to one's belief state (the Ramsey test), Stalnaker proposed a possible worlds semantics in which an indicative or counterfactual conditional is true just in case its consequent holds at the "closest" antecedent worlds. This provided a unified account of ordinary and counterfactual conditionals, explained the failure of principles such as Transitivity and Strengthening the Antecedent, and suggested a corresponding modal logic of a non-material conditional connective.

David Lewis's logics of counterfactuals

Stalnaker's framework was soon generalized and made more systematic. In a joint paper, Stalnaker and Richmond Thomason gave a fully explicit semantics and axiomatization for conditional logics in terms of selection functions that pick, for each world and antecedent proposition, a set of closest antecedent worlds, thereby turning Stalnaker's informal proposal into a family of well-behaved formal systems. Around the same time, David Lewis developed an alternative but closely related "variably strict" account using comparative similarity orderings over possible worlds, culminating in his monograph Counterfactuals and a hierarchy of systems (V, VW, VC) for counterfactual conditionals. These works established the now standard picture of conditionals evaluated relative to similarity or selection among possible worlds, and they framed many of the central questions about which structural principles such logics should validate.

During the mid-1970s and early 1980s, researchers working in the Stalnaker–Lewis tradition developed a shared axiomatic and semantic toolkit. Brian Chellas introduced the system CK (and its hyperintensional variant Ck) as a "basic conditional logic", corresponding to the core selection function semantics and serving as an analogue of the normal modal logic K for conditionals. John Burgess later supplied simplified completeness proofs for a range of conditional logics and introduced system B, tied to ordering semantics. Donald Nute's monograph Topics in Conditional Logic (1980) synthesized these developments, systematizing selection function, ordering, and relative modality frameworks and mapping out the space of normal conditional logics that extend CK in different ways.

By the late 1980s and 1990s, conditional logic had become tightly connected with work on nonmonotonic reasoning and probabilistic conditionals. Ernest W. Adams had already proposed a high probability consequence relation for simple indicative conditionals, based on identifying the acceptability of "if A then B" with a high conditional probability P(B|A). Building on both the Stalnaker–Lewis semantics and Adams's ideas, Kraus, Lehmann, and Magidor introduced preferential and cumulative models for defeasible conditionals, and defined the nonmonotonic consequence system P, which can be seen as corresponding to the "flat" (non-nested) fragment of several variably strict conditional logics and of Burgess's system B. This work cemented the role of conditional logics as a link between philosophical analyses of "if ... then ..." and AI formalisms for default and defeasible inference.

In parallel, possible worlds approaches spawned alternative but equivalent perspectives. Premise based and "ordering source" semantics, originating with Frank Veltman and further developed by Lewis and Angelika Kratzer, reinterpreted conditionals in terms of sets of background premises or ordering sources that are updated or restricted by the antecedent, showing how similarity based models could be recast in more explicitly epistemic and dynamic terms. At the same time, belief revision theorists such as Peter Gärdenfors investigated conditionals via AGM revision and the Ramsey test, while proof theorists developed sequent and tableau calculi for many of the main systems of conditional logic.

More recently, survey articles and handbooks have emphasized that conditional logic is not a single system but a cluster of related frameworks: trivalent, possible worlds, premise based, probabilistic, and belief revision based that can often be intertranslated or shown to share a common "flat" fragment. The Stanford Encyclopedia of Philosophy entry on the logic of conditionals, for example, situates Stalnaker's 1968 proposal as a central ancestor of modern conditional logics and highlights how later work by Lewis, Nute, Burgess, Kratzer, Kraus–Lehmann–Magidor, and others has diversified and refined the field over the past half century.

== Semantics ==
Conditional logics are often grouped by their semantic framework.

=== Truth-functional and trivalent approaches ===
Some systems remain truth-functional but use more than two truth values. Łukasiewicz introduced a three-valued logic; de Finetti later argued that "if A then B" should be void when A is false (a bet is called off). Modern trivalent systems (e.g., Cooper/Cantwell's and de Finetti–inspired logics) typically validate modus ponens but invalidate modus tollens and contraposition. They aim to block material implication paradoxes and to connect to suppositional/probabilistic intuitions.

=== Possible worlds semantics ===
A dominant intensional tradition treats conditionals as quantifying over accessible or similar worlds.

- Strict conditional (C. I. Lewis): $A \mathbin{>} B \;\equiv\; \Box(A \supset B)$. Powerful, but too strong for natural language (validates strengthening, transitivity, and contraposition).
- Variably strict (Stalnaker–Lewis): truth depends on the closest A-worlds (given a contextually supplied similarity or selection function). These invalidate strengthening, transitivity, and contraposition, better fitting linguistic data.

Within this family, axiomatic systems range from basic normal logics (CK) to Burgess's B, Lewis's V/VW/VC, and Stalnaker's C2. Many retain rules like Right Weakening and Conditional K but reject classical schemas such as Strengthening the Antecedent, Transitivity, and Contraposition.

=== Nonmonotonic and preferential models ===
In AI, "if A then normally B" is modeled by preference orderings over states. Kraus, Lehmann, and Magidor's systems C/P/R characterize rational, defeasible consequence; the flat (non-nested) fragment of several conditional logics coincides with their P system.

=== Premise semantics ===
Premise (or ordering source) semantics evaluates "if A then C" by keeping a maximal subset of background premises consistent with A and checking whether C follows. It captures context sensitivity and is equivalent (via theorems) to similarity based ordering semantics.

=== Probabilistic approaches ===
Adams proposed that for simple (non-nested) indicatives the probability of "if A then B" equals the conditional probability $P(B\mid A)$. His consequence relation (preserving high probability) validates the KLM system P and rejects strengthening, transitivity, and contraposition. Lewis's triviality results show that identifying all conditional probabilities with probabilities of (possibly nested) conditionals collapses to trivial constraints; under Stalnaker semantics the probability of a conditional instead matches imaging on the antecedent, not Bayesian conditioning. Subsequent work explores product space models and coherence based previsions for compounds of conditionals.

=== Belief revision and the Ramsey test ===
On the AGM model of belief revision, "if A then B" is accepted if and only if, after minimally revising a belief set by A, B is believed. This can be understood as a formal version of the Ramsey test. Combined with standard AGM postulates this yields a triviality theorem due to Gärdenfors, prompting proposals to weaken the postulates, restrict compounds, or replace revision with update/imaging.

=== Relevance and difference-making ===
Beyond topic relevance in relevance logic, many theorists require that A make a (probabilistic or doxastic) difference to B for a conditional to be assertable or valid. This motivates confirmational scores (e.g., P(B|A) > P(B)) and connexive logic principles, often at the cost of rules like Right Weakening.

== Axiom systems ==
Many conditional logics are given by Hilbert–style calculi extending classical propositional logic with a distinguished conditional connective $\mathbin{>}$. A typical system contains all propositional tautologies in the language with $\mathbin{>}$, is closed under modus ponens, and is further closed under some combination of structural rules and schematic principles for $\mathbin{>}$. This section summarizes some historically central systems and their axiomatizations.

=== Core rules and schematic principles ===
Most normal systems for $\mathbin{>}$ are formulated using the following rules, where $\vDash$ is classical consequence and $A,B,C,D$ are formulas:

- (MP) Modus ponens: from $A$ and $A \to B$, infer $B$.
- (LLE) Left logical equivalence: from $\vDash A \equiv B$, infer $(A \mathbin{>} C) \equiv (B \mathbin{>} C)$.
- (RW) Right weakening: from $\vDash C \to D$, infer $(A \mathbin{>} C) \to (A \mathbin{>} D)$.
- (RCK) Conditional K: from $(C_1 \land \cdots \land C_n) \to D$, infer $[(A \mathbin{>} C_1)\land\cdots\land(A \mathbin{>} C_n)] \to (A \mathbin{>} D)$, for any $n \ge 0$.

A conditional logic is often called normal when it contains all propositional tautologies and is closed under (MP), (LLE) and (RCK); (RCK) then entails several further principles such as Logical Truth, Right Weakening and And below.

Many systems are most conveniently described in terms of which of the following schematic principles they validate (all schemata are schemata of the form "for all formulas $A,B,C$ ..."):

LT (Logical truth)
$$A \mathbin{>} \top$$
ID (Identity)
$$A \mathbin{>} A$$
AND
$$((A \mathbin{>} B)\land(A \mathbin{>} C)) \to (A \mathbin{>}(B \land C))$$
OR
$$((A \mathbin{>} C)\land(B \mathbin{>} C)) \to ((A \lor B) \mathbin{>} C)$$
CCut (Cautious transitivity)
$$((A \mathbin{>} B)\land((A \land B) \mathbin{>} C)) \to (A \mathbin{>} C)$$
CMon (Cautious monotonicity)
$$((A \mathbin{>} B)\land(A \mathbin{>} C)) \to ((A \land B) \mathbin{>} C)$$
Rec (Reciprocity)
$$((A \mathbin{>} B)\land(B \mathbin{>} A)) \to ((A \mathbin{>} C) \equiv (B \mathbin{>} C))$$
RMon (Rational monotonicity)
$$((A \mathbin{>} B)\land \neg(A \mathbin{>} \neg C)) \to ((A \land C) \mathbin{>} B)$$
SM (Stronger-than-material)
$$(A \mathbin{>} B) \to (A \to B)$$
CS (Conjunctive sufficiency)
$$(A \land B) \to (A \mathbin{>} B)$$
CEM (Conditional excluded middle)
$$(A \mathbin{>} B) \lor (A \mathbin{>} \neg B)$$

These principles are motivated both by selection–function and ordering–semantics for conditionals, and many can be derived in stronger systems rather than taken as primitive axioms.

=== Basic normal systems: Ck and CK ===
A convenient starting point is Chellas's basic conditional logics Ck and CK, which correspond to the core selection function semantics for conditionals.

- Ck is the minimal system containing all propositional tautologies and closed under (MP) and (RCK). It may be viewed as a "hyperintensional" base system: it validates (RCK) but not (LLE).
- CK adds (LLE) to Ck. Equivalently, CK is the smallest logic containing all propositional tautologies and closed under (MP), (LLE) and (RCK). In CK, principles (LT), (RW) and (AND) are theorems, while stronger principles such as (ID), (OR), (CMon), (Rec), (RMon), (SM), (CS) and (CEM) are generally not validated.

CK is often taken as the conditional analogue of the normal modal logic K: it axiomatizes the basic variably strict semantics with arbitrary selection functions or similarity orderings, without extra frame conditions.

=== Burgess's system B and its extensions (V, VW, VC, C2, SS, NP) ===
Building on CK, a family of stronger logics is obtained by adding further schemata. Égré and Rott highlight nine "salient" systems Ck, CK, B, SS, NP, V, VW, VC and C2, all normal in the above sense.

B
Burgess's system B is the smallest extension of CK in which (ID), (OR) and (CMon) hold; with (RCK) and (LLE) these also yield (AND), (CCut) and (Rec). In ordering semantics, B corresponds to models in which each world is equipped with a reflexive and transitive similarity preorder.

V
Lewis's logic V adds to B the principle (RMon). Semantically, this corresponds to strengthening the similarity ordering to a weak order (modular, total-preorder–like) at each evaluation world.

VW
System VW further extends V by validating (SM), so that every conditional implies the corresponding material conditional. This makes VW suitable as a weaker "counterfactual" logic that still preserves modus ponens in the usual way.

VC
Lewis's "official" logic of counterfactuals VC adds (CS) to VW. VC is thus the smallest normal logic extending V that validates both (SM) and (CS); in Lewis's sphere semantics this corresponds to total preorders with additional constraints ensuring that whenever both $A$ and $A\land B$ are possible, $A \land B$–worlds are among the closest $A$–worlds.

C2
Stalnaker's logic C2 can be obtained from VC by replacing (CS) with the stronger (CEM). C2 is thus VC + (CEM), and it characterizes the simplified Stalnaker models in which each antecedent selects a unique closest antecedent world at every evaluation point.

SS
Pollock's system SS is obtained by adding (SM) and (CS) directly to B (rather than via V). It validates many of the same laws as VC but is based on partial, rather than total, similarity orderings.

NP
Delgrande's system NP is another extension of CK: like B it validates (ID), (AND), (OR) and (CCut), but instead of (CMon) it validates (RMon). This shows that the cautious and rational forms of monotonicity are independent over CK.

These systems all validate (LT) and (AND), differ on the status of (ID), (OR), (CCut), (CMon), (Rec), (RMon), (SM), (CS) and (CEM), and none validates full Monotonicity, Transitivity or Contraposition for $\mathbin{>}$.

=== Selection function axiomatizations (Lewis–Nute tradition) ===
An alternative but equivalent presentation of many of the above systems is widely used in the Lewis–Nute tradition, and is convenient when relating conditional logics directly to selection function semantics. In this type of axiomatization, one takes as primitive:

- all propositional tautologies in the language with $\mathbin{>}$;
- the rule (MP);
- one or both of the "replacement" rules

(RCEC) from $\varphi \leftrightarrow \psi$, infer $(\chi \mathbin{>} \varphi) \leftrightarrow (\chi \mathbin{>} \psi)$;
(RCEA) from $\varphi \leftrightarrow \psi$, infer $(\varphi \mathbin{>} \chi) \leftrightarrow (\psi \mathbin{>} \chi)$;

- and the rule

(RCK) as above.

In this setting, the Lewis systems V, VW, VC and Stalnaker's C2 can be described as the smallest conditional logics containing all tautologies, closed under (MP), (RCEC) and (RCK), and containing all substitution instances of appropriate sets of schemata such as:

ID $\varphi \mathbin{>} \varphi$;
MP/SM $(\varphi \mathbin{>} \psi) \to (\varphi \to \psi)$;
MOD $(\neg \varphi \mathbin{>} \varphi) \to (\psi \mathbin{>} \varphi)$;
CSO $((\varphi \mathbin{>} \psi)\land(\psi \mathbin{>} \varphi)) \to ((\varphi \mathbin{>} \chi) \leftrightarrow (\psi \mathbin{>} \chi))$;
CV $((\varphi \mathbin{>} \psi)\land\neg(\varphi \mathbin{>} \neg \chi)) \to ((\varphi \land \chi) \mathbin{>} \psi)$;
CS $(\varphi \land \psi) \to (\varphi \mathbin{>} \psi)$;
CEM $(\varphi \mathbin{>} \psi) \lor (\varphi \mathbin{>} \neg \psi)$.

For example, one standard presentation takes:

- V as the smallest logic with (RCEC), (RCK) and schemata ID, MOD, CSO, CV;
- VW as V + (SM);
- VC as VW + (CS);
- C2 as VC with (CS) replaced by (CEM).

These axiomatizations are equivalent to the ones described via the Table 6 schemata above and are often used in proof theory and automated reasoning for conditional logics.

=== Nonmonotonic consequence systems C, P and R ===
In artificial intelligence and nonmonotonic reasoning it is common to work, not directly with a connective $\mathbin{>}$, but with a defeasible consequence relation $\vdash_{\!\sim}$ intended to capture defaults of the form "normally, if $A$ then $B$". Kraus, Lehmann and Magidor axiomatized three central such systems, now known as C, P and R.

These systems are given by rules on $\vdash_{\!\sim}$ such as:

- (ID_{~}) Identity: $A \vdash_{\!\sim} A$.
- (LLE_{~}) Left logical equivalence: if $\vDash A \equiv B$ and $A \vdash_{\!\sim} C$, then $B \vdash_{\!\sim} C$.
- (RW_{~}) Right weakening: if $\vDash C \to D$ and $A \vdash_{\!\sim} C$, then $A \vdash_{\!\sim} D$.
- (CCut_{~}) Cautious cut: from $A \vdash_{\!\sim} B$ and $A \land B \vdash_{\!\sim} C$, infer $A \vdash_{\!\sim} C$.
- (CMon_{~}) Cautious monotonicity: from $A \vdash_{\!\sim} B$ and $A \vdash_{\!\sim} C$, infer $A \land B \vdash_{\!\sim} C$.
- (AND_{~}) And: from $A \vdash_{\!\sim} B$ and $A \vdash_{\!\sim} C$, infer $A \vdash_{\!\sim} (B \land C)$.
- (OR_{~}) Or: from $A \vdash_{\!\sim} C$ and $B \vdash_{\!\sim} C$, infer $A \lor B \vdash_{\!\sim} C$.
- (RMon_{~}) Rational monotonicity: from $A \vdash_{\!\sim} C$ and not $A \vdash_{\!\sim} \neg B$, infer $A \land B \vdash_{\!\sim} C$.

On this basis one defines:

- System C (cumulative): the smallest relation satisfying (ID_{~}), (LLE_{~}), (RW_{~}), (CCut_{~}) and (CMon_{~}) (and hence (AND_{~})).
- System P (preferential): C plus (OR_{~}); it is sound and complete for preferential models and corresponds to the "flat" ($L_1$) fragment of several conditional logics such as B and VC.
- System R (rational): P plus (RMon_{~}); it is complete for ranked (totally ordered) preferential models.

Via translations of the form "$A \mathbin{>} B$ is accepted iff $A \vdash_{\!\sim} B$", these nonmonotonic systems can be seen as providing the flat fragments of many of the selection–function conditional logics described above, linking conditional logic to AGM belief revision and default reasoning.

== See also ==
- Indicative conditional
- Counterfactual conditional
- Material conditional
- Possible world
- Nonmonotonic logic
- Belief revision
- Conditional probability
- Connexive logic
- Relevance logic
- Dynamic semantics
- Ramsey test
