= Delia Graff Fara =

American philosopher (1969–2017)

- Born: Delia Ruby Graff; April 28, 1969; New York City, U.S.
- Died: July 18, 2017 (aged 48)
- Spouse: Michael
- Children: 1

Education
- Education: Harvard University; Massachusetts Institute of Technology
- Thesis: The Phenomena of Vagueness (1997)
- Doctoral advisor: George Boolos; Robert Stalnaker

Philosophical work
- Era: Contemporary philosophy
- School: Analytic philosophy
- Institutions: Princeton University; Cornell University
- Notable students: Daniel Rothschild
- Main interests: Philosophy of language; philosophical logic; metaphysics
- Notable ideas: Interest-relative theory of vagueness

Delia Ruby Graff Fara (/ˈfɑːrə/; April 28, 1969 – July 18, 2017) was an American philosopher who was professor of philosophy at Princeton University. She specialized in philosophy of language, metaphysics, and philosophical logic.

== Early life ==
Fara was born in Jamaica, Queens, New York City. Her mother was African-American and her father was of Irish and Jewish ancestry. She was raised by her mother as a single parent in New York after her father died when she was a child.

== Education and career ==
Fara completed her undergraduate studies at Harvard University in 1991, and later obtained her PhD from the Massachusetts Institute of Technology in 1997. During her doctoral studies, she was supervised by philosophers George Boolos and Robert Stalnaker. After completing her education, Fara joined the Princeton faculty in 1997 as an assistant professor. In 2001, she moved to Cornell University, and in 2005, she returned to Princeton as a tenured associate professor. In 2014, Fara was appointed Equal Opportunity Officer of Princeton's Philosophy Department, where she advocated for diversity and the interests of underrepresented members of the academic community.

Fara died in July 2017.[1]

== Philosophical work ==
Graff Fara is best known for her work on the problem of vagueness, where she defends an interest-relative theory of "contextualism". In her most influential article, "Shifting Sands: An Interest-Relative Theory of Vagueness", she argues that the meanings of vague expressions render the truth conditions of utterances of sentences containing them sensitive to our interests. In her view, as the Stanford Encyclopedia of Philosophy entry on "vagueness" explains, "interest relativity extends to all vague words. For instance, 'child' means a degree of immaturity that is significant to the speaker. Since the interests of the speaker shift, there is an opportunity for a shift in the extension of 'child'."

== Selected publications ==
- "Shifting Sands: An Interest-Relative Theory of Vagueness." Philosophical Topics 28 (2000): 45–81.
- "Descriptions As Predicates." Philosophical Studies 102 (2001): 1-42.
- "Phenomenal Continua and the Sorites." Mind 110 (2001): 905–935.
- The Routledge Companion to Philosophy of Language (co-edited with Gillian Russell). Routledge, 2011.
- "Specifying desires." Nous 47 (2013): 252–272.
- "Names Are Predicates." Philosophical Review 124 (2015): 59–117.
