= Philip Johnson-Laird =

British-American psychologist (born 1936)

Philip Johnson-Laird FRS FBA
- Born: Philip Nicholas Johnson-Laird; 12 October 1936 (age 90); Leeds, England
- Education: University College London
- Known for: Mental models
- Scientific career
- Fields: Cognitive psychology
- Workplaces: University College London; University of Sussex; University of Cambridge; Princeton University
- Thesis: An experimental investigation into one pragmatic factor governing the use of the english language (1967)
- Doctoral advisor: Peter Cathcart Wason

Philip Nicholas Johnson-Laird (born 12 October 1936) is a British-American psychologist. He is a philosopher of language and reasoning and a developer of the mental model theory of reasoning. He was a professor at Princeton University's Department of Psychology, as well as the author of several notable books on human cognition and the psychology of reasoning.

== Biography ==
He was educated at Culford School and University College London where he won the Rosa Morison Medal in 1964 and a James Sully Scholarship between 1964 and 1966. He achieved a BA there in 1964 and a PhD in 1967. He was elected to a Fellowship in 1994.

His entry in Who's Who (2007 edition) records the following career history:

- Ten years of miscellaneous jobs, as surveyor, musician, hospital porter (alternative to National Service), librarian, before going to university.
- Assistant Lecturer, then Lecturer, in Psychology, UCL, 1966–73
- Visiting Member, Institute for Advanced Study in Princeton, New Jersey, 1971–72
- Reader, 1973, Professor, 1978, in Experimental Psychology, University of Sussex
- Visiting Fellow, Stanford University, 1980
- Assistant Director, MRC Applied Psychology Unit, University of Cambridge, 1983–89
- Fellow, Darwin College, Cambridge, 1984–89
- Visiting Professorships: Stanford University, 1985; Princeton Univ., 1986.

He joined the department of psychology at Princeton University in 1989, where he became the Stuart Professor of Psychology in 1994. He retired in 2012.

Johnson-Laird is a member of the American Philosophical Society, a Fellow of the Royal Society, a Fellow of the British Academy, a William James Fellow of the Association for Psychological Science, and a Fellow of the Cognitive Science Society. He has been awarded honorary doctorates from: Göteborg, 1983; Padua, 1997; Madrid, 2000; Dublin, 2000; Ghent, 2002; Palermo, 2005. He won the Spearman Medal in 1974, the British Psychological Society President's Award in 1985, and the International Prize from Fyssen Foundation in 2002.

Along with several other scholars, Johnson-Laird delivered the 2001 Gifford Lectures in Natural Theology at the University of Glasgow, published as The Nature and Limits of Human Understanding (ed. Anthony Sanford, T & T Clark, 2003). He has been a member of the United States National Academy of Sciences since 2007.

== Selected publications ==
- Johnson-Laird, P. N. (2010). "Mental models and human reasoning". Proceedings of the National Academy of Sciences. 107 (43): 18243–18250. doi:10.1073/pnas.1012933107. PMC 2972923. PMID 20956326.
- Johnson-Laird, Philip N (2006). How We Reason. Oxford University Press. ISBN 978-0-19-856976-3.
- Johnson-Laird, P. N. (2002). "Peirce, logic diagrams, and the elementary operations of reasoning". Thinking & Reasoning. 8: 69–95. doi:10.1080/13546780143000099. S2CID 5726135.
- Johnson-Laird, Philip N (1988). Computer and the Mind: An Introduction to Cognitive Science. Harvard University Press. ISBN 978-0-674-15616-6.
- Johnson-Laird, Philip N (1993). Human and Machine Thinking (Distinguished Lecture Series). LEA, Inc. ISBN 978-0-8058-0921-3.
- Johnson-Laird, Philip N (with Ruth M. J. Byrne) (1991). Deduction. Psychology Press. ISBN 978-0-86377-149-1.
- Johnson-Laird, Philip N (1983). Mental Models: Toward a Cognitive Science of Language, Inference and Consciousness. Harvard University Press. ISBN 978-0-674-56882-2.
- Johnson-Laird, Philip N (with Peter Cathcart Wason) (1977). Thinking: Readings in Cognitive Science. Cambridge University Press.
- Johnson-Laird, Philip N (with George Armitage Miller) (1976). Language and Perception. Belknap Press. ISBN 978-0-674-50948-1.
- Johnson-Laird, Philip N (with Peter Cathcart Wason) (1972). Psychology of Reasoning: Structure and Content. Harvard University Press. ISBN 978-0-674-72127-2.
