= Counterfactual thinking =

Concept in psychology

Counterfactual thinking is a concept in psychology that involves the human tendency to create possible alternatives to life events that have already occurred; something that is contrary to what actually happened. Counterfactual thinking is, as it states: "counter to the facts". These thoughts consist of the "What if?" and the "If only..." that occur when thinking of how things could have turned out differently. Counterfactual thoughts include things that – in the present – could not have happened because they are dependent on events that did not occur in the past.

== Overview ==
The term counterfactual is defined by the Merriam-Webster Dictionary as "contrary to fact". A counterfactual thought occurs when a person modifies a factual prior event and then assesses the consequences of that change. A person may imagine how an outcome could have turned out differently, if the antecedents that led to that event were different. For example, a person may reflect upon how a car accident could have turned out by imagining how some of the factors could have been different, for example, "If only I hadn't been speeding." These alternatives can be better or worse than the actual situation, and in turn give improved or more disastrous possible outcomes, "If only I hadn't been speeding, my car wouldn't have been wrecked" or "If I hadn't been wearing a seatbelt, I would have been killed".

Counterfactual thoughts have been shown to produce negative emotions; however they may also produce functional or beneficial effects. There are two types of counterfactual thoughts: downward and upward. Downward counterfactuals are thoughts about how the situation could have been worse; and people tend to have a more positive view of the actual outcome. Upward counterfactuals are thoughts about how the situation could have been better. These kinds of thoughts tend to make people feel dissatisfied and unhappy; however, upward counterfactuals are the kind of thoughts that allow people to think about how they can do better in the future. These counterfactual thoughts, or thoughts of what could have happened, can affect people's emotions, such as causing them to experience regret, guilt, relief, or satisfaction. They can also affect how they view social situations, such as who deserves blame and responsibility.

== History ==
Counterfactual thinking has philosophical roots and can be traced back to early philosophers such as Aristotle and Plato who pondered the epistemological status of subjunctive suppositions and their nonexistent but feasible outcomes. In the seventeenth century, the German philosopher Leibniz argued that there could be an infinite number of alternate worlds, so long as they were not in conflict with laws of logic. The philosopher Nicholas Rescher (as well as others) has written about the interrelationship between counterfactual reasoning and modal logic. This relationship may also be exploited in literature or Victorian Studies, painting and poetry. Ruth M.J. Byrne in The Rational Imagination: How People Create Alternatives to Reality (2005) proposed that the mental representations and cognitive processes that underlie the imagination of alternatives to reality are similar to those that underlie rational thought, including reasoning from counterfactual conditionals.

More recently, counterfactual thinking has gained interest from a psychological perspective. Cognitive scientists have examined the mental representations and cognitive processes that underlie the creation of counterfactuals. Daniel Kahneman and Amos Tversky (1982) pioneered the study of counterfactual thought, showing that people tend to think 'if only' more often about exceptional events than about normal events. Many related tendencies have since been examined, e.g., whether the event is an action or inaction, whether it is controllable, its place in the temporal order of events, or its causal relation to other events. Social psychologists have studied cognitive functioning and counterfactuals in a larger, social context.

Early research on counterfactual thinking took the perspective that these kinds of thoughts were indicative of poor coping skills, psychological error or bias, and were generally dysfunctional in nature. As research developed, a new wave of insight beginning in the 1990s began taking a functional perspective, believing that counterfactual thinking served as a largely beneficial behavioral regulator. Although negative feelings and biases arise, the overall benefit is positive for human behavior.

== Activation ==
There are two portions to counterfactual thinking: activation and content. The activation portion is whether we allow the counterfactual thought to seep into our conscious thought. The content portion creates the end scenario for the counterfactual antecedent.

The activation portion raises the question of why we allow ourselves to think of other alternatives that could have been beneficial or harmful to us. It is believed that humans tend to think of counterfactual ideas when there were exceptional circumstances that led to an event, and thus could have been avoided in the first place. We also tend to create counterfactual ideas when we feel guilty about a situation and wish to exert more control. For example, in a study by Davis et al., parents who suffered the death of an infant were more likely to counterfactually think 15 months later if they felt guilty about the incident or if there were unusual circumstances surrounding the death. In the case of a death due to natural causes, parents tended to counterfactually think less over the course of time.

Another factor that determines how much we use counterfactual thought is how close we were to an alternative outcome. This is especially true when there is a negative outcome that was this close to a positive outcome. For example, in a study by Meyers-Levy and Maheswaran, subjects were more likely to counterfactual think alternative circumstances for a target person if their house burned down three days after they forgot to renew their insurance versus six months after they forgot to renew their insurance. Therefore, the idea that an outcome almost occurred plays a role in the reason we emphasize that outcome.

== Functional basis ==
One may wonder why we continue to think in counterfactual ways if these thoughts tend to make us feel guilty or negatively about an outcome. One of the functional reasons for this is to avoid making mistakes again in the future. If a person is able to consider another outcome based on a different path, they may take that path in the future and avoid the undesired outcome. The past cannot be changed, but similar situations may occur in the future, and thus we take our counterfactual thoughts as a learning experience. For example, if a person has a poor job interview and thinks about how it may have been more successful if they had responded in a more confident manner, they are more likely to respond more confidently in their next interview.

=== Risk aversion ===
Another reason we continue to use counterfactual thinking is to avoid situations that may be unpleasant to us, which is part of our approach and avoidance behavior. Often, people make a conscious effort to avoid situations that may make them feel unpleasant. However, despite our best efforts, we sometimes find ourselves in these unpleasant situations anyway. In these situations, we continue to use counterfactual thinking to think of ways that that event could have been avoided and in turn to learn to avoid those situations again in the future. For example, if a person finds hospitals to be an uncomfortable place, but find themselves in one due to cutting their finger while doing dishes, they may think of ways they could have avoided going to the hospital by tending to the wound themselves or doing the dishes more carefully.

=== Behavior intention ===
We continue to use counterfactual thoughts to change our future behavior in a way that is more positive, or behavior intention. This can involve making a change in our behavior immediately after the negative event occurred. By actively making a behavioral change, we are completely avoiding the problem again in the future. An example is forgetting Mother's Day, and immediately writing the date on the calendar for the following year, to avoid the problem.

=== Goal-directed activity ===
In the same sense as behavior intention, people tend to use counterfactual thinking in goal-directed activity. Studies have shown that counterfactuals serve a preparative function for both individuals and groups. When people fail to achieve their goals, counterfactual thinking may be activated (e.g., studying more after a disappointing grade). When they engage in upward counterfactual thinking, people are able to imagine alternatives with better positive outcomes. The outcome seems worse when compared to positive alternative outcomes. This realization motivates them to take positive action in order to meet their goal in the future.

Markman, Gavanski, Sherman, and McMullen (1993) identified the repeatability of an event as an important factor in determining what function will be used. For events that happen repeatedly (e.g., sports) there is an increased motivation to imagine alternative antecedents in order to prepare for a better future outcome. For one-time events, however, the opportunity to improve future performance does not exist, so it is more likely that the person will try to alleviate disappointment by imagining how things could have been worse. The direction of the counterfactual statement is also indicative of which function may be used. Upward counterfactuals have a greater preparative function and focus on future improvement, while downward counterfactuals are used as a coping mechanism in an affective function. Furthermore, additive counterfactuals have shown greater potential to induce behavioral intentions of improving performance. Hence, counterfactual thinking motivates individuals to goal-oriented actions in order to attain their (failed) goal in the future.

=== Collective action ===
On the other hand, at a group level, counterfactual thinking can lead to collective action. According to Milesi and Catellani (2011), political activists exhibit group commitment and are more likely to re-engage in collective action following a collective defeat and show when they are engaging in counterfactual thinking. Unlike the cognitive processes involved at individual level, abstract counterfactuals lead to an increase in group identification, which is positively correlated with collective action intention. The increase in group identification impacts people's feelings. Abstract counterfactuals also lead to an increase in group efficacy, which translates to belief that the group has the ability to change outcomes of situations. This in turn motivates group members to make group-based actions to attain their goal in the future.

=== Benefits and consequences ===
When thinking of downward counterfactual thinking, or ways that the situation could have turned out worse, people tend to feel a sense of relief. For example, if after getting into a car accident somebody thinks "At least I wasn't speeding, then my car would have been totaled." This allows for consideration of the positives of the situation, rather than the negatives. In the case of upward counterfactual thinking, people tend to feel more negative feelings (e.g., regret, disappointment) about the situation. When thinking in this manner, people focus on ways that the situation could have turned out more positively: for example, "If only I had studied more, then I wouldn't have failed my test".

== Current research ==
As with many cognitive processes, research seeks to gain better insight into the functions and outcomes of how counterfactual thinking works. Research has been investigating various effects and how they might alter or contribute to counterfactual thinking. One study by Rim and Summerville (2014) investigated the distance of the event in terms of time and how this distance can affect the counterfactual process. Their results showed that "people generated more downward counterfactuals about recent...past events, while they tended to generate more upward counterfactuals about distant...past events", which was consistent in their replications for social distance as well. They also examine the possible mechanism of manipulating social distance and the effect this could have on responding to negative events in either a self-improvement or self-enhancement motivations.

Research by Scholl and Sassenberg (2014) looked to determine how perceived power in the situation can affect the counterfactual thought and process associated to understanding future directions and outlooks. The research examined how manipulating the perceived power of the individual in the given circumstance can lead to different thoughts and reflections. Their research "demonstrated that being powerless (vs. powerful) diminished self-focused counterfactual thinking by lowering sensed personal control." These results may show a relationship between how the self perceives events and determines the best course of action for future behavior.

Mizraji proposed an approach to counterfactual reasoning through two phases. The first uses a matrix representation of logical operations inspired by neural models of distributed memories. Here logical operators are real matrices and the truth values are also vectors of real components. Counterfactual propositions are "virtualized" by premultiplying the counterfactual values by an operator created in the domain of quantum computing, the square root of NOT. This procedure produces logic vectors in the complex field that combine falsehood and truth in the same evaluation. In the second phase, the physical plausibility and logical consistency of the counterfactual propositions are estimated and a plausibility operator is obtained that returns the complex values to the domain of real numbers and helps to decide if the counterfactual proposition is true or false.

== Types ==
=== Upward and downward ===
Upward counterfactual thinking focuses on how the situation could have been better. Many times, people think about what they could have done differently. For example, "If I had started studying three days ago, instead of last night, I could have done better on my test." Since people often think about what they could have done differently, it is not uncommon for people to feel regret during upward counterfactual thinking.

Downward counterfactual thinking focuses on how the situation could have been worse. In this scenario, a person can make themselves feel better about the outcome because they realize that the situation is not the worst it could be. For example, "I'm lucky I earned a 'C' on that; I didn't start studying until last night."

=== Additive/subtractive ===
A counterfactual statement may involve the addition or subtraction of an event. An additive statement involves engaging in an event that did not originally occur (e.g., I should have taken medicine) whereas a subtractive statement involves removing an event that took place (e.g., I should have never started drinking). Additive counterfactuals are more frequent than subtractive counterfactuals.

Additive and upward counterfactual thinking focuses on "what else could I have done to do better?" Subtractive and upward counterfactual thinking focuses on "what shouldn't I have done so I could do better?" In contrast, an additive and downward scenario would be, "If I went drinking last night as well, I would have done worse", while a subtractive and downward scenario would be, "if I didn't start studying two days ago, I would have done worse".

=== Self vs. other ===
This distinction simply refers to whether the counterfactual is about actions of the self (e.g., I should have slowed down) or someone else's actions (e.g., The other driver should have slowed down).

Type of Counterfactual	Definition	Example
Upward	A type of counterfactual that involves comparing the present outcome to a better outcome.	"If I had studied more, I would have done better on the exam"
Downward	A type of counterfactual that involves comparing the present outcome to a worse outcome.	"At least I didn't fail the exam, even if I got a lower than expected grade"
Additive	A type of counterfactual that involves imagining the addition of an event that did not occur in reality to simulate an alternative outcome.	"If I had taken the medicine, I would have been healthier now"
Subtractive	A type of counterfactual that involves imagining the deletion of an action or event that happened in reality, in order to simulate an alternative outcome.	"If I hadn't gone out with my friends, I would have passed the exam"
Self-focused	A type of counterfactual that involves focusing on the actions performed by the self.	"I should have studied more for this test"
Other-focused	A type of counterfactual that involves focusing on the actions performed by others.	"He should have studied more if he wanted to do better on the test."

=== Integrative Summary of Typologies of Counterfactual Thinking ===
People generate additive counterfactuals more frequently than subtractive counterfactuals, because people are more readily able to imagine additional actions that they "could have" taken than omissions. Upward counterfactuals tend to support planning and performance improvement, whereas downward counterfactuals often serve an affect-regulation function by helping individuals feel better about negative outcomes. Self-focused counterfactuals are more prevalent than other-focused counterfactuals party because the event in question is psychologically closer than an event in which others are involved, consistent with the Construal level theory.

== Theories ==
=== Norm theory ===
Kahneman and Miller (1986) proposed the norm theory as a theoretical basis to describe the rationale for counterfactual thoughts. Norm theory suggests that the ease of imagining a different outcome determines the counterfactual alternatives created. Norms involve a pairwise comparison between a cognitive standard and an experiential outcome. A discrepancy elicits an affective response which is influenced by the magnitude and direction of the difference. For example, if a server makes twenty dollars more than an average night, a positive feeling will be evoked. If a student earns a lower grade than is typical, a negative feeling will be evoked. Generally, upward counterfactuals are likely to result in a negative mood, while downward counterfactuals elicit positive moods.

Kahneman and Miller (1986) also introduced the concept of mutability to describe the ease or difficulty of cognitively altering a given outcome. An immutable outcome (e.g., gravity) is difficult to modify cognitively whereas a mutable outcome (e.g., speed) is easier to cognitively modify. Most events lie somewhere in the middle of these extremes. The more mutable the antecedents of an outcome are, the greater availability there is of counterfactual thoughts.

Wells and Gavanski (1989) studied counterfactual thinking in terms of mutability and causality. An event or antecedent is considered causal if mutating that event will lead to undoing the outcome. Some events are more mutable than others. Exceptional events (e.g., taking an unusual route then getting into an accident) are more mutable than normal events (e.g., taking a usual route and getting into an accident). This mutability, however, may only pertain to exceptional cases (e.g., a car accident). Controllable events (e.g., intentional decision) are typically more mutable than uncontrollable events (e.g., natural disaster). In short, the greater the number of alternative outcomes constructed, the more unexpected the event, and the stronger emotional reaction elicited.

=== Rational imagination theory ===
Byrne (2005) outlined a set of cognitive principles that guide the possibilities that people think about when they imagine an alternative to reality. Experiments show that people tend to think about realistic possibilities, rather than unrealistic possibilities, and they tend to think about few possibilities rather than many. Counterfactuals are special in part because they require people to think about at least two possibilities (reality and an alternative to reality), and to think about a possibility that was false, but temporarily assumed to be true. Experiments have corroborated the proposal that the principles that guide the possibilities that people think about most readily, explain their tendencies to focus on, for example, exceptional events rather than normal events, actions rather than inactions, and more recent events rather than earlier events in a sequence.

=== Functional theory ===
The functional theory looks at how counterfactual thinking and its cognitive processes benefit people. Counterfactuals serve a preparative function, and help people avoid past blunders. Counterfactual thinking also serves the affective function to make a person feel better. By comparing one's present outcome to a less desirable outcome, the person may feel better about the current situation. For example, a disappointed runner who did not win a race may feel better by saying, "At least I did not come in last."

Although counterfactual thinking is largely adaptive in its functionality, there are exceptions. For individuals experiencing severe depressive symptoms, perceptions of control are diminished by negative self-perceptions and low self-efficacy. As a result, motivation for self-improvement is weakened. Even when depressed individuals focus on controllable events, their counterfactuals are less reasonable and feasible. Epstude and Roese (2008) propose that excessive counterfactual thoughts can lead people to worry more about their problems and increase distress. When individuals are heavily focused on improving outcomes, they will be more likely to engage in maladaptive counterfactual thinking. Other behavior such as procrastination may lead to less effective counterfactual thinking. Procrastinators show a tendency to produce more downward counterfactuals than upward counterfactuals. As a result, they tend to become complacent and lack motivation for change. Perfectionists are another group for whom counterfactual thinking may not be functional.

=== Rational counterfactuals ===
Tshilidzi Marwala introduced rational counterfactual which is a counterfactual that, given the factual, maximizes the attainment of the desired consequent. For an example, suppose a factual statement: She forgot to set her alarm, and consequently, was late. Its counterfactual would be: If she had set the alarm, she would have been on time. The theory of rational counterfactuals identifies the antecedent that gives the desired consequent necessary for rational decision making. For example, suppose there is an explosion in a chemical plant. The rational counterfactual will be what should have been the situation to ensure that the possibility of an explosion is minimized.

== Examples ==
In the case of Olympic medalists, counterfactual thinking explains why bronze medalists are often more satisfied with the outcome than silver medalists. The counterfactual thoughts for silver medalists tend to focus on how close they are to the gold medal, displaying upward counterfactual thinking, whereas bronze medalists tend to counterfactually think about how they could have not received a medal at all, displaying downward counterfactual thinking.

Another example is the satisfaction of college students with their grades. Medvec and Savitsky studied satisfaction of college students based on whether their grade barely missed the cutoff versus if they had barely made the cutoff for a category. Students that barely made it into a grade category tended to downward counterfactually think and were more satisfied, thinking it could have been worse. These students tended to think in terms of "At least I..." Students that were extremely close to making it into the next higher category showed higher dissatisfaction and tended to upward counterfactually think, or focus on how the situation could have been better. These students tended to think in terms of "I could have..."

== Counterfactual Thinking and Mental Health ==
Growing evidence has linked certain forms of counterfactual thinking to mental health difficulties. While counterfactuals can support learning and help prepare individuals for future outcomes, they may also contribute to psychological distress when they become frequent, rigid, or strongly negative.

=== Depression ===
Individuals with major depressive disorders often show heightened sensitivity to counterfactual outcomes, especially regret. Regret arises when imagining how a choice might have led to a better result because regret involves evaluating one's own decisions and is closely tied to self esteem. Cognitive neuroscience research has proposed that the upward counterfactuals may be impactful when dealing with the unstable or negatively biased self-representation aspect of depression. Counterfactual thinking based regret may contribute to some aspects of low mood and self criticism persist in depression.

=== Anxiety ===
Counterfactual thinking also intersects with anxiety because imagining better possible outcomes can resemble a ruminative style often seen in anxious individuals. People high in trait anxiety tend to use more negative language when generating counterfactuals, report more difficulty in imagining emotions associated with improved outcomes, and perceive upward counterfactuals as less likely. This shows that counterfactual thinking is less beneficial in anxiety and associated with the worry and expectations of negative events sustaining.

=== Trauma and Post Traumatic Stress ===
Counterfactual thoughts are common following traumatic experiences. Studies where individuals reported more frequent and vivid counterfactuals after a traumatic event, also showed higher levels of post-traumatic stress, anxiety, and depression. These findings suggest that persistent ruminative thoughts sustain distress long after the traumatic event occurred.

=== Personality Traits and Emotional Vulnerability ===
Personality traits also shape the counterfactual process. Upward counterfactuals are associated with stronger and longer lasting negative emotions among those with higher neuroticism. Counterfactual thinking and personality contribute separately to emotional vulnerability, rather than one simply causing the other.

=== Summary ===
Upward counterfactuals can help people learn from setbacks and plan for better outcomes. When counterfactuals become repetitive, self critical, or hyperfixated on unattainable alternative scenarios, they may correlate with symptoms of depression, anxiety, and trauma related stress. Understanding these differences remains an active area of psychological research.

== See also ==
- Counterfactual history
- Parallel universe (disambiguation)
