= Restricted area =

Restricted area may refer to:

- An area that only authorized people can enter (crime: trespassing); see also exclusion zone
- Restricted area, a zone within the key of a basketball court
- A departure area after the customs counters in most airports
