= Restriction =

Restriction, restrict or restrictor may refer to:

== Science and technology ==
- restrict, a keyword in the C programming language used in pointer declarations
- Restriction enzyme, a type of enzyme that cleaves genetic material

=== Mathematics and logic ===
- Restriction, a term in medieval supposition theory
- Restriction (mathematics), an aspect of a mathematical function
- Inflation-restriction exact sequence in mathematics

== Other uses ==
- Censorship
- RESTRICT Act, a proposal to combat technology deemed to undermine the United States
- Restrictor (linguistics), a word or morpheme that specifies the meaning of a quantifier; see Polarity item
- Restrictiveness, a modifier in semantics

== See also ==
- Restricted (disambiguation)
