= Ruth M. J. Byrne =

Irish cognitive scientist and psychologist

Ruth Byrne
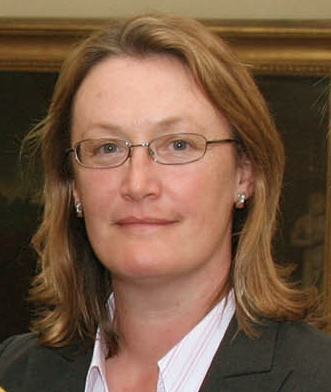
- Ruth M.J. Byrne, Ireland, 2007.
- Born: 1 March 1962 (age 64); Dublin, Ireland
- Citizenship: Irish
- Education: University College Dublin; Trinity College Dublin
- Scientific career
- Fields: Cognitive Psychology Cognitive Science
- Workplaces: University College Dublin; Trinity College Dublin; Cardiff University; MRC Applied Psychology Unit, Cambridge.

Ruth M.J. Byrne, FTCD, MRIA, (born 1962) is an Irish cognitive scientist and author of several books on psychology of reasoning. She is the Professor of Cognitive Science, in the School of Psychology and Institute of Neuroscience, Trinity College Dublin. She is the former Vice Provost of Trinity College Dublin.

== Career ==
Byrne was awarded a BA in Psychology from University College Dublin (UCD) in 1983. She completed a PhD in Cognitive Psychology at Trinity College Dublin (TCD) in 1986. She worked as a research scientist at the Applied Psychology Unit of University of Cambridge from 1986 to 1989 and as a lecturer in Psychology at Cardiff University from 1989 to 1991. Byrne returned to Ireland in early 1991 as a college lecturer in the computer science department at UCD, and later that year she moved to a lectureship in the psychology department at TCD. She became an associate professor (now termed professor) in 1999, and full professor (personal chair), Professor of Cognitive Science, in 2005. Byrne was elected a Fellow of TCD in 1995, and became a Senior Fellow in 2021. She was the Vice Provost of TCD from 2005 to 2008, and has also served as head of TCD's Psychology department and deputy director of its Institute of neuroscience.

Byrne was elected a member of the Royal Irish Academy in 2007. She was awarded the Royal Irish Academy's 2021 Gold Medal in the Social Sciences.

== Publication ==
Her writings include:

- The Rational Imagination: How People Create Alternatives to Reality (2005, MIT Press)
- Deduction (1991, co-author Philip Johnson-Laird, Erlbaum)
- Human Reasoning (1993, with Jonathan St B. T. Evans & Stephen Newstead, Erlbaum)
