= Robert Stalnaker =

American philosopher (born 1940)

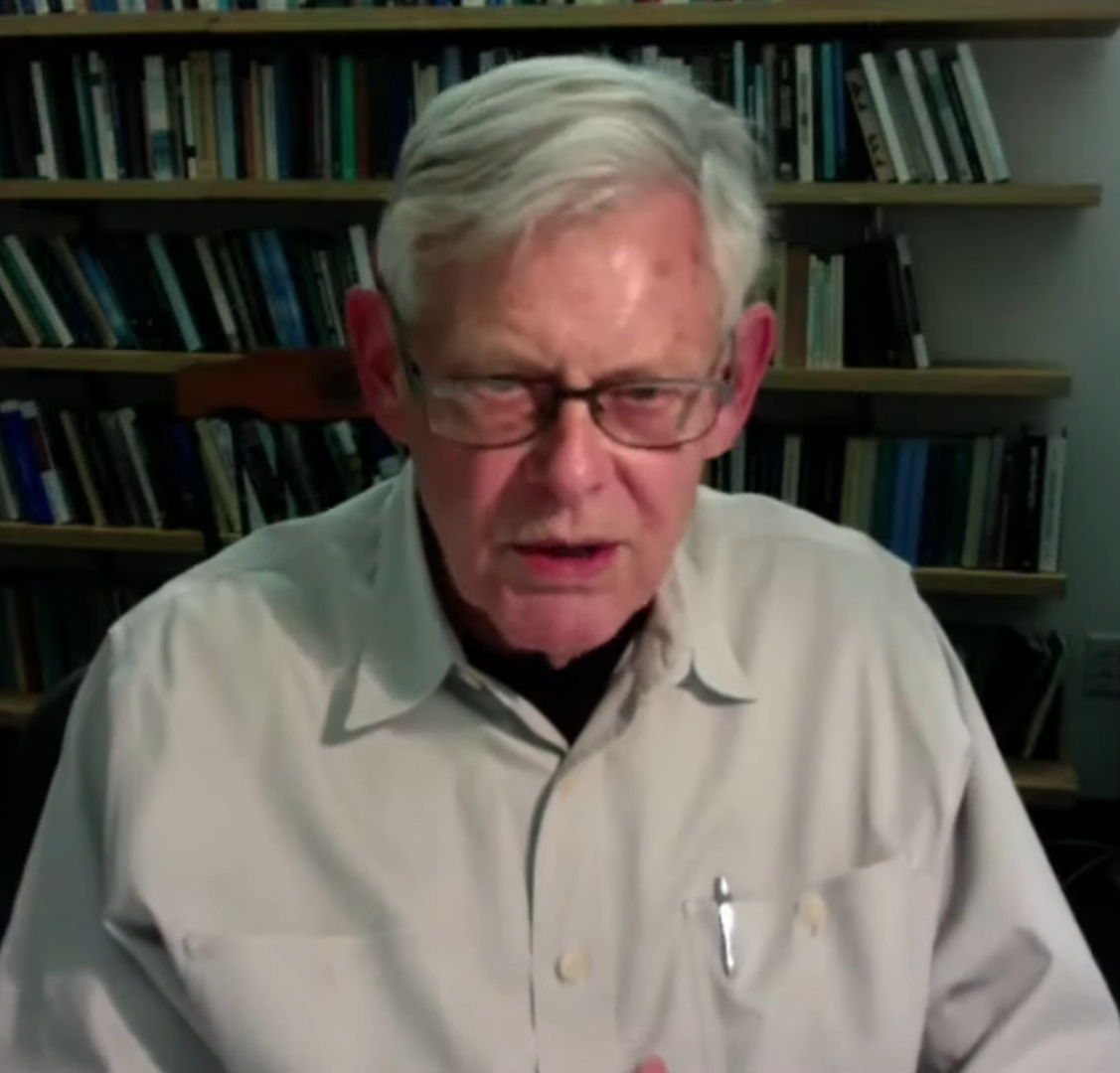
- Stalnaker in 2021
- Born: Robert Culp Stalnaker; January 22, 1940 (age 86)

Education
- Education: Wesleyan University; Princeton University
- Thesis: Historical Interpretation (1965)
- Doctoral advisor: Stuart Hampshire
- Other advisor: Carl Gustav Hempel

Philosophical work
- School: Analytic philosophy; Actualism
- Institutions: Yale University; University of Illinois; Cornell University; Massachusetts Institute of Technology
- Doctoral students: Delia Graff Fara; Jason Stanley
- Main interests: Decision theory; epistemology; philosophy of language; philosophy of mind; pragmatics
- Notable ideas: Two-dimensionalism; possible world semantics; assertion as narrowing the conversational common ground; conditional logic

Robert Culp Stalnaker (born 1940) is an American philosopher who is Laurance S. Rockefeller Professor Emeritus of Philosophy at the Massachusetts Institute of Technology. He is a Fellow of the American Academy of Arts and Sciences and a Corresponding Fellow of the British Academy.

== Education and career ==
Stalnaker was born on January 22, 1940. He earned his BA from Wesleyan University, and his PhD from Princeton University in 1965. His thesis advisor was Stuart Hampshire, though he was strongly influenced by another faculty member, Carl Hempel. Stalnaker taught briefly at Yale University and the University of Illinois, and then for many years at the Sage School of Philosophy at Cornell University before joining the MIT faculty in 1988. He retired from MIT in 2016. His many students include Jason Stanley, Zoltán Gendler Szábo, and Delia Graff Fara.

In 2007, Stalnaker delivered the John Locke Lectures at Oxford University on the topic of "Our Knowledge of the Internal World". In 2017, he delivered the Casalegno Lectures at the University of Milan on "Counterfactuals and Practical Reason".

== Philosophical work ==
His work concerns, among other things, the philosophical foundations of semantics, pragmatics, philosophical logic, decision theory, game theory, the theory of conditionals, epistemology, and the philosophy of mind. All of these interests are in the service of addressing the problem of intentionality, "what it is to represent the world in both speech and thought". In his work, he seeks to provide a naturalistic account of intentionality, characterizing representation in terms of causal and modal notions.

Along with Saul Kripke, David Lewis, and Alvin Plantinga, Stalnaker has been one of the most influential theorists exploring philosophical aspects of possible world semantics. According to his view of possible worlds, they are ways this world could have been, which in turn are maximal properties that this world could have had. This view distinguishes him from the influential modal realist Lewis, who argued that possible worlds are concrete entities just like this world. Stalnaker's work on conditionals is reputed to have started the field of conditional logic.

In addition to his contributions to the metaphysics of possible worlds, he has used the apparatus of possible worlds semantics to explore many issues in the semantics of natural language, including counterfactual and indicative conditionals, and presupposition. His view of assertion as narrowing the conversational common ground to exclude situations in which the asserted content is false was a major impetus in recent developments in semantics and pragmatics, in particular, the so-called "dynamic turn".

Stalnaker is the author of four books and dozens of articles in major philosophical journals.

== Works ==
This is a list of Stalnaker's works.

=== Books ===
- Inquiry. Cambridge, MA: Bradford Books/MIT Press, 1984.
- Context and Content: Essays on Intentionality in Speech and Thought. Oxford: Oxford University Press, 1999.
- Ways a World Might Be: Metaphysical and Anti-metaphysical Essays. Oxford: Oxford University Press, 2003.
- Our Knowledge of the Internal World. Oxford: Oxford University Press, 2008.
- Mere Possibilities: Metaphysical Foundations of Modal Semantics. Princeton, NJ: Princeton University Press, 2012.
- Context. Oxford: Oxford University Press, 2014.
- Knowledge and Conditionals: Essays on the Structure of Inquiry. Oxford: Oxford University Press, 2019.

=== Edited volumes ===
- Ifs: Conditionals, Belief, Decision, Chance, and Time (with William L. Harper and Glenn Pearce, eds.). Dordrecht: D. Reidel, 1981.
- Fact and Value: Essays on Ethics and Metaphysics for Judith Jarvis Thomson (with Alex Byrne and Ralph Wedgwood, eds.). Cambridge, MA: MIT Press, 2000.

=== Articles and chapters ===
- "Events, Periods and Institutions in Historians' Language." History and Theory 6 (1967): 159–179.
- "A Theory of Conditionals." In Nicholas Rescher (ed.), Studies in Logical Theory. Oxford: Oxford University Press, 1968, pp. 98–112.
- "Modality and Reference" (with R. H. Thomason). Noûs 2 (1968): 359–372.
- "Abstraction in First-Order Modal Logic" (with R. H. Thomason). Theoria 34 (1968): 203–207.
- "Wallace on Propositional Attitudes." The Journal of Philosophy 66 (1969): 803–806.
- "Probability and Conditionals." Philosophy of Science 37 (1970): 64–80.
- "A Semantic Analysis of Conditional Logic" (with R. H. Thomason). Theoria 36 (1970).
- "Pragmatics." Synthese 22 (1970): 272–289.
- "A Semantic Theory of Adverbs" (with R. H. Thomason). Linguistic Inquiry 4 (1973): 195–220.
- "Presuppositions." Journal of Philosophical Logic 2 (1973): 447–457.
- "Pragmatic Presuppositions." In Milton K. Munitz and Peter Unger (eds.), Semantics and Philosophy. New York: New York University Press, 1974, pp. 197–213.
- "Indicative Conditionals." Philosophia 5 (1975): 269–286.
- "Propositions." In Alfred F. MacKay and Daniel D. Merrill (eds.), Issues in the Philosophy of Language. New Haven: Yale University Press, 1976, pp. 79–91.
- "Possible Worlds." Noûs 10 (1976): 65–75.
- "Complex Predicates." The Monist 60 (1977): 327–339.
- "Assertion." In Peter Cole (ed.), Syntax and Semantics, vol. 9. New York: Academic Press, 1978, pp. 315–332.
- "Anti-essentialism." Midwest Studies in Philosophy 4 (1979): 343–355.
- "Indexical Belief." Synthese 49 (1981): 129–151.
- "Logical Semiotic." In Evandro Agazzi (ed.), Modern Logic – A Survey. Dordrecht: D. Reidel, 1981, pp. 439–456.
- "A Defense of Conditional Excluded Middle." In William L. Harper, Robert Stalnaker, and Glenn Pearce (eds.), Ifs: Conditionals, Belief, Decision, Chance, and Time. Dordrecht: D. Reidel, 1981, pp. 87–104.
- "Possible Worlds and Situations." Journal of Philosophical Logic 15 (1986): 109–123.
- "Counterparts and Identity." Midwest Studies in Philosophy 11 (1987) (Studies in Essentialism).
- "Replies to Schiffer and Field." Pacific Philosophical Quarterly 68 (1987): 113–123.
- "Semantics for Belief." Philosophical Topics 15 (1987): 177–190.
- "Belief Attribution and Context." In Robert H. Grimm and Daniel D. Merrill (eds.), Contents of Thought. Tucson: University of Arizona Press, 1988, pp. 140–156.
- "Vague Identity." In David F. Austin (ed.), Philosophical Analysis. Dordrecht: Kluwer, 1988, pp. 349–360.
- "Critical Notice of David Lewis, On the Plurality of Worlds." Mind (1988): 117–128.
- "On What's in the Head." Philosophical Perspectives 3 (1989): 287–316.
- "Mental Content and Linguistic Form." Philosophical Studies 58 (1990): 129–146.
- "Narrow Content." In C. Anthony Anderson and Joseph Owens (eds.), Propositional Attitudes: The Role of Content in Logic, Language, and Mind. Stanford: CSLI, 1990, pp. 131–146.
- "How to Do Semantics for the Language of Thought." In Barry Loewer and Georges Rey (eds.), Meaning and Mind: Fodor and His Critics. Oxford: Blackwell, 1991, pp. 229–237.
- "The Problem of Logical Omniscience, I." Synthese 89 (1991): 425–440.
- "Notes on Conditional Semantics." In Richard Fagin (ed.), Proceedings of the Fourth Conference on Theoretical Aspects of Reasoning about Knowledge. San Mateo, CA: Morgan Kaufmann, 1992, pp. 316–327.
- "Critical Notice of David Sanford, If P, then Q." Notre Dame Journal of Formal Logic 33 (1992): 291–297.
- "Twin Earth Revisited." Proceedings of the Aristotelian Society (1993): 297–311.
- "What Is the Representational Theory of Thinking?" (comment on Lycan). Mind and Language 8 (1993): 423–430.
- "A Note on Nonmonotonic Modal Logic." Artificial Intelligence 64 (1993): 183–196.
- "What Is a Non-monotonic Consequence Relation?" Fundamenta Informaticae 21 (1994).
- "On the Evaluation of Solution Concepts." Theory and Decision 37 (1994): 49–73.
- "Conditionals as Random Variables" (with R. C. Jeffrey). In Ellery Eells and Brian Skyrms (eds.), Probability and Conditionals: Belief Revision and Rational Decision. Cambridge: Cambridge University Press, 1994, pp. 31–46.
- "The Interaction of Modality with Quantification and Identity." In Walter Sinnott-Armstrong, Diana Raffman, and Nicholas Asher (eds.), Modality, Morality and Belief: Essays in Honor of Ruth Barcan Marcus. Cambridge: Cambridge University Press, 1994, pp. 12–28.
- "On What Possible Worlds Could Not Be." In John Morton and Stephen Stich (eds.), Benacerraf and His Critics. Oxford: Blackwell, 1996, pp. 103–119.
- "On a Defense of the Hegemony of Representation." In Enrique Villanueva (ed.), Perception. Atascadero, CA: Ridgeview, 1996, pp. 101–108.
- "Knowledge, Belief and Counterfactual Reasoning in Games." Economics and Philosophy 12 (1996): 133–162.
- "Impossibilities." Philosophical Topics 24 (1996): 193–204.
- "Varieties of Supervenience." Philosophical Perspectives 10 (1996): 221–241.
- "On the Representation of Context." Journal of Logic, Language and Information 7 (1998): 3–19.
- "Los nombres y la referencia: semántica y metasemántica." Theorema 17 (1998): 7–19.
- "Belief Revision in Games: Forward and Backward Induction." Mathematical Social Sciences 36 (1998): 31–56.
- "What Might Nonconceptual Content Be?" In Enrique Villanueva (ed.), Concepts. Atascadero, CA: Ridgeview, 1998, pp. 339–352.
- "Extensive and Strategic Forms: Games and Models for Games." Research in Economics 53 (1999): 293–319.
- "Dualism, Conceptual Analysis and the Explanatory Gap" (with Ned Block). The Philosophical Review 108 (1999): 1–46.
- "Logical Omniscience, II." In Context and Content: Essays on Intentionality in Speech and Thought. Oxford: Oxford University Press, 1999, pp. 255–273.
- "Comparing Qualia Across Persons." Philosophical Topics 26 (2000): 385–405.
- "On Moore's Paradox." In Pascal Engel (ed.), Believing and Accepting. Dordrecht: Kluwer, 2000, pp. 93–100.
- "On Considering a Possible World as Actual." Proceedings of the Aristotelian Society (Supplementary Volume) 75 (2001): 141–156.
- "Metaphysics without Conceptual Analysis." Philosophy and Phenomenological Research 62 (2001): 631–636.
- "Epistemic Consequentialism." Proceedings of the Aristotelian Society (Supplementary Volume) 76 (2002): 153–168.
- "What Is It Like to Be a Zombie?" In John Hawthorne and Tamar Szabó Gendler (eds.), Conceivability and Possibility. Oxford: Oxford University Press, 2002, pp. 385–400.
- "Common Ground." Linguistics and Philosophy 25 (2002): 701–721.
- "Conceptual Truth and Metaphysical Necessity." In Ways a World Might Be: Metaphysical and Anti-metaphysical Essays. Oxford: Oxford University Press, 2003.
- "On Thomas Nagel's Objective Self." In Ways a World Might Be: Metaphysical and Anti-metaphysical Essays. Oxford: Oxford University Press, 2003.
- "Comments on 'From Contextualism to Contrastivism in Epistemology'." Philosophical Studies (2003).
- "Lewis on Intentionality." Australasian Journal of Philosophy 82 (2004): 199–212.
- "Assertion Revisited: On the Interpretation of Two-Dimensional Modal Semantics." Philosophical Studies 118 (2004): 299–322.
- "Conditional Assertions and Conditional Propositions." In New Work on Modality (MIT Working Papers in Linguistics and Philosophy 51), 2005.
- "Saying and Meaning, Cheap Talk and Credibility." In Anton Benz, Gerhard Jäger, and Robert van Rooij (eds.), Game Theory and Pragmatics. New York: Palgrave Macmillan, 2005.
- "On Logics of Knowledge and Belief." Philosophical Studies 128(1) (2006): 169–199.
- "Ways a World Might Be." Philosophical Studies 133 (2007): 439–441.
- "Responses." Philosophical Studies 133 (2007): 481–491.
- "Responses." In Judith Jarvis Thomson and Alex Byrne (eds.), Content and Modality: Themes from the Philosophy of Robert Stalnaker. Oxford: Oxford University Press, 2007.
- "Critical Notice of Scott Soames's Case against Two-Dimensionalism." The Philosophical Review 116 (2007): 255–266.
- "What Is de re Belief?" In Joseph Almog and Paolo Leonardi (eds.), The Philosophy of David Kaplan. Oxford: Oxford University Press, 2009.
- "A Response to Abbott on Presupposition and Common Ground." Linguistics and Philosophy 31 (2009): 539–544.
- "Iterated Belief Revision." Erkenntnis 70 (2009): 189–209.
- "On Hawthorne and Magidor on Assertion, Context, and Epistemic Accessibility." Mind 118(470) (2009): 399–409.
- "Merely Possible Propositions." In Bob Hale and Aviv Hoffmann (eds.), Modality: Metaphysics, Logic, and Epistemology. Oxford: Oxford University Press, 2010, pp. 21–32.
- "The Metaphysical Conception of Analyticity." Philosophy and Phenomenological Research 82(2) (2010): 507–514.
- "Models and Reality." Canadian Journal of Philosophy 46(4–5) (2016): 709–726.
- "Reference Fixing and the Contingent A Priori." Theoria 88(2) (2021): 438–452.

=== Handbook and encyclopedia articles ===
- "Pragmatik." In Jürgen Speck (ed.), Handbuch Wissenschaftstheoretischer Begriffe. 1975, pp. 501–506.
- "Robert Stalnaker." In Stephen Guttenplan (ed.), A Companion to the Philosophy of Mind. Oxford: Blackwell, 1994, pp. 561–568.
- "Modality and Possible Worlds." In Jaegwon Kim and Ernest Sosa (eds.), A Companion to Metaphysics. Oxford: Blackwell, 1994, pp. 333–337.
- "Reference and Necessity." In Crispin Wright and Bob Hale (eds.), A Companion to the Philosophy of Language. Oxford: Blackwell, 1997, pp. 534–554.
- "Logical Omniscience, Problem of." In Robert A. Wilson and Frank C. Keil (eds.), The MIT Encyclopedia of the Cognitive Sciences. Cambridge, MA: MIT Press, 1999, pp. 489–490.
- "Propositional Attitudes." In Robert A. Wilson and Frank C. Keil (eds.), The MIT Encyclopedia of the Cognitive Sciences. Cambridge, MA: MIT Press, 1999, pp. 678–679.
- "David Lewis." In David Sosa (ed.), A Companion to Analytic Philosophy. Oxford: Blackwell, 2001, pp. 478–488.

== See also ==
- American philosophy

Academic offices
Preceded by Robert Brandom	John Locke Lecturer; 2007	Succeeded by Hartry Field
