= Dub =

Dub or dubbing commonly refer to:

- Dubbing, in video post-production
- Dubbing, conferring a knighthood
  - Accolade, a medieval knighting ritual
- Dub music, a subgenre of reggae

Dub, DUB, dubs or dubbing may also refer to:

== Arts and media ==
=== Film and television ===
- The Dub, a lost 1919 American silent comedy film
- Yaya Dub, 2015 character on Philippine TV show Eat Bulaga!

=== Literature ===
- Dub (magazine), a custom car culture periodical
- Dub poetry, a performance poetry style
- 2nd Lieutenant Dub, in 1920s novel The Good Soldier Švejk

=== Music ===
- Dubbing (music), transfer or copying of previously recorded audio material from one medium to another
- The Dubs, American 1950s doo-wop vocal group
- "Dub", a song by Yeat from 2 Alive (2022)

== Biology ==
- Deubiquitinating enzyme
- Dysfunctional uterine bleeding

== Language ==
- DUB (cuneiform), an alphabetic sign
- Dubitative mood (DUB), in grammar
- "Dub", the letter W

== People ==
=== During the Middle Ages ===
- Dub Calgaid mac Laidcnén (died 769), King of the Uí Cheinnselaig of South Leinster
- Dub Dá Leithe mac Tomaltach (died 816), King of Uí Maine
- Dub Lémna ingen Tighearnáin (died 943), Queen of Ireland
- Dub, King of Scotland (died 967), King of Alba
- Dub Chablaigh ingen Cathal (died 1009), Queen of Ireland
- Dub dá Leithe (died 1064), Abbot of Armagh
- Máel Dub (died 675), Irish monk
- Amlaíb Dub, Olaf the Black (died 1237), sea-king who ruled the Isle of Man and parts of the Hebrides

=== Modern era ===
- Dub (nickname), list of people nicknamed Dub or Dubs
- Dubs (surname), list of people named Dubs
- Gene Dub (born 1943), Canadian architect and politician
- Dub FX (Benjamin Stanford; born 1983), Australian street performer and musician
- A person from Dublin, Ireland

== Places ==
=== Bosnia-Herzegovina ===
- Dub (Hadžići)
- Dub (Rogatica)
- Dub, Travnik

=== Ireland ===
- Dublin (Dub.)
- Dublin Airport (IATA:DUB)

=== Elsewhere ===
- Dub (Prachatice District), Czech Republic
- Dub (Bajina Bašta), Serbia
- Dub, Kotor, Montenegro
- Dub, Lublin Voivodeship, Poland

== Sport ==
- Dubs (mascot), of the Washington Huskies teams
- Down Under Bowl, Australian high school football competition
- Dublin GAA, known by fans as "The Dubs", an Irish Gaelic football team
- The Dubuque Dubs, a Dubuque, Iowa minor league baseball team (1906–1915)
- The Golden State Warriors and Washington Wizards, two National Basketball Association teams nicknamed "The Dubs"

== Transport ==
- Dub (wheel), a wheel or rim over 20 inches wide
- Dübs and Company, a Scottish locomotive works
- Dublin Airport, Ireland (IATA:DUB)

== Other uses ==
- Dubbing (poultry), removal of birds' combs, wattles and earlobes
- Post-nominal for University of Dublin graduates (Dub.)

== See also ==
- Dub-Indrecht mac Cathail (died 768), King of Connacht
- Doubs, a department in the Franche-Comté region of France
- Doubs (river) in eastern France
- Dubbin, a wax product used to soften, condition and waterproof leather
- Dubbins, a surname
- U-dub (disambiguation), nickname of several American universities whose names start with the letter W
