= Status =

Status (Latin plural: statūs), is a state, condition, or situation, and may refer to:

- Status (law)
  - Legal status, in law
  - Political status, in international law
  - Small entity status, in patent law
  - Status conference
  - Status crime
- Marital status
- Observer status, in international organizations
- Senior status
- Social status, in sociology
  - Achieved status
  - Ascribed status
  - Master status
  - Socioeconomic status
  - Sociometric status
  - Status attainment
  - Status offense
  - Status shift
- Status constructus, a noun form
- Status match, in frequent-flyer loyalty programs
- Status quo
- Status symbol

== Arts, entertainment, and media ==
- Status, a magazine edited by Igor Cassini
- Status (newsletter), a media industry newsletter
- Recurring status, in acting
- Status effect, in gaming

=== Computing ===
- Exit status, in computer science
- HTTP status codes, a type of server response on the web
- Process state, also called process status
- Status bar, in user interface design
- Status message (instant messaging)
- Status register, in computer science

== Religion ==
- Oratory status, in churches

== Science and healthcare ==
- Abundance (ecology) of taxa or biota
- Conservation status of a species
- HIV test (HIV Status)
- Performance status, in medicine

== Technology ==
- HTC Status, or HTC ChaCha, Android smartphone by HTC
- Status tones, in telecommunication

== See also ==
- Condition (disambiguation)
- Situation (disambiguation)
- State (disambiguation)
