= Bone oil =

Bone oil may refer to:

- Neatsfoot oil, a yellow oil used as a conditioning, softening and preservative for leather
- Dippel's oil, a nitrogenous by-product of the dry distillation manufacture of bone char
