= State Theatre =

State Theatre or State Theater may refer to:

== Australia ==
- State Theatre (Adelaide), former cinema in Hindley Street built on the site of the old Wondergraph
- State Theatre (Melbourne), a theatre opened in 1984, part of the Arts Centre Melbourne
- State Theatre (Sydney), heritage-listed cinema built in the 1920s
- State Theatre Centre of Western Australia, Perth, Western Australia, a theatre complex opened in 2011

== United States ==
=== California ===
- Golden State Theatre, also known as State Theatre, Monterey
- State Theatre (Oroville, California), listed on the National Register of Historic Places (NRHP) in Butte County
- State Theatre (Los Angeles)
- State Theatre (Red Bluff, California)

=== Delaware ===
- State Theater (Newark, Delaware)

=== Florida ===
- Hippodrome State Theatre, Gainesville
- State Theatre (St. Petersburg, Florida)
- State Theatre (Plant City, Florida)

=== Indiana ===
- Blackstone-State Theater, also known as State Theater, in South Bend

=== Kentucky ===
- State Theatre (Elizabethtown, Kentucky), NRHP-listed in Hardin County

=== Louisiana ===
- State Palace Theatre (New Orleans, Louisiana)

=== Maine ===
- State Theatre (Portland, Maine)

=== Michigan ===
- State Theatre (Ann Arbor, Michigan)
- State Theatre (Bay City, Michigan)
- State Theatre (Benton Harbor, Michigan)
- The Fillmore Detroit, formerly the State Theatre
- State Theatre (Kalamazoo, Michigan)
- State Theatre (Traverse City, Michigan)

=== Minnesota ===
- State Theatre (Minneapolis, Minnesota)
- Lyric Center for the Arts, formerly the State Theater, in Virginia, Minnesota

=== New Jersey ===
- State Theatre (New Brunswick, New Jersey)

=== New Mexico ===
- State Theater (Clovis, New Mexico)

=== New York ===
- State Theater (Ithaca, New York)
- Loew's State Theatre (New York City)
- David H. Koch Theater, formerly the New York State Theater, part of Lincoln Center
- Landmark Theatre (Syracuse, New York), originally named Loew’s State Theatre

=== Ohio ===
- State Theatre (Cleveland, Ohio)
- State Theatre (Sandusky, Ohio), also known as Schine State Theatre
- State Theater (Youngstown, Ohio)

=== Pennsylvania ===
- State Theatre (Easton, Pennsylvania)
- State Theatre (State College, Pennsylvania), a non-profit community theatre
- State Theatre Center for the Arts (Uniontown, Pennsylvania)

=== Texas ===
- State Theatre (Austin, Texas), a theatre in Austin

=== Virginia ===
- State Theatre (Falls Church, Virginia), a 1936 restaurant and concert venue

=== Wisconsin ===
- State Theatre (Eau Claire, Wisconsin)
- State Theater (Milwaukee), a former movie theater

== Other countries ==
- State Theatre (Hong Kong), China
- Kaunas State Musical Theatre, Kaunas, Lithuania
- State Theatre (Hamilton, New Zealand)
- State Jewish Theater (Romania), Bucharest, Romania
- State Theatre Košice, Slovakia
- South African State Theatre, Pretoria
- Turkish State Theatres, with venues in 19 cities
- State Cinema, Grays, Essex, England, UK once called Gray's State Theatre
