= Conditioner =

A conditioner is something that improves the quality of another item.

Conditioner may refer to:

- Conditioner (chemistry)
- Conditioner (farming)
- Air conditioner
- Fabric conditioner
- Hair conditioner
- Leather conditioner
- Power conditioner
- The apparatus that contains most of the resurfacing components on an ice resurfacer

== See also ==
- Condition (disambiguation)
