= Leather conditioner =

Material in leathermaking

Conditioners used on leather take many shapes and forms. They are used mostly to keep leather from drying out and deteriorating.

New leather contains natural oils that help make the leather soft and supple. The oils are volatile and evaporate over time. This causes the leather to shrink and stiffen, and sometimes to crack. Conditioning restores moisture, brings out natural colors, and extends the life of the leather.

A very old and widely used conditioner is dubbin. Other common conditioners are mink oil and saddle soap.

== See also ==
- Leather: preservation and conditioning
