= Dubs (surname) =

Dubs is a surname. Notable people with the surname include:

- Adolph Dubs (1920–1979), U.S. ambassador to Afghanistan
- Alf Dubs, Baron Dubs (born 1932), British politician and former Member of Parliament
- Ivo Dubš (born 1974), Czech retired volleyball player
- Henry Dübs (1816–1876), German-born British businessman and engineer
- Homer H. Dubs (1892–1969), American sinologist and polymath
- Jakob Dubs (1822–1879), Swiss politician
- Rudolph Dubs (1837–1915), bishop of the Evangelical Association

== See also ==
- Dub (disambiguation) § People
- Dub (nickname)
