= If then =

If then may refer to:

- if-then, a construct in computer programming
- If/Then, a 2014 musical
- If Then (The Morning Show), an episode of the American television series The Morning Show
- "If/Then", an episode in season 8 of Grey's Anatomy

== See also ==
- "If-Then-Else", an episode of Person of Interest
- If Then Else, a 2000 album by The Gathering
- Conditional (disambiguation)
