= Overdubbing =

Audio recording technique

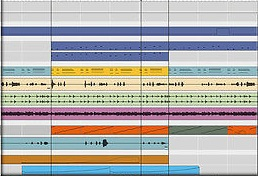
An example of multiple audio tracks

Overdubbing (also known as layering) is a technique used in audio recording in which audio tracks that have been pre-recorded are then played back and monitored, while simultaneously recording new, doubled, or augmented tracks onto one or more available tracks of a digital audio workstation (DAW) or tape recorder. The overdub process can be repeated multiple times. This technique is often used with singers, as well as with instruments, or ensembles/orchestras. Overdubbing is typically done for the purpose of adding richness and complexity to the original recording. For example, if there are only one or two artists involved in the recording process, overdubbing can give the effect of sounding like many performers.

In vocal performances, the performer usually listens to an existing recorded performance (usually through headphones in a recording studio) and simultaneously plays a new performance along with it, which is also recorded. The intention is that the final mix will contain a combination of these "dubs".

Another kind of overdubbing is the so called "tracking" (or "laying the basic tracks"), where tracks containing the rhythm section (usually including drums) are recorded first, then following up with overdubs (solo instruments, such as keyboards or guitar, then finally vocals). This method has been the standard technique for recording popular music since the early 1960s. Today, overdubbing can be accomplished even on basic recording equipment, or a typical PC equipped with a sound card, using digital audio workstation software.

Because the process of overdubbing involves working with pre-recorded material, the performers involved do not have to ever have physically met each other, nor even still be alive. In 1991, decades after her father Nat King Cole had died, Natalie Cole released a "virtual duet" recording of "Unforgettable" where she overdubbed her vocals onto her father's original recording from the 1960s. As there is no limit in timespan with overdubbing, there is likewise no limit in distance, nor in the number of overdubbed layers. Perhaps the most wide-reaching collaborative overdub recording was accomplished by Eric Whitacre in 2013, where he edited together a "Virtual Choir" of 8,409 audio tracks from 5,905 people from 101 countries.

== History ==
Perhaps the earliest commercial issue of recordings with overdubs was by RCA Victor in the late 1920s, not long after the introduction of electric microphones into the recording studio. Recordings by the late Enrico Caruso still sold well, so RCA took some of his early records made with only piano accompaniment, added a studio orchestra, and reissued the recordings.

A foreshadow of overdubbing can be seen with Sidney Bechet, an American jazz musician who made a pair of famous overdubbed sides in 1941 entitled "The Sheik of Araby" and "Blues of Bechet". The multi-instrumentalist recorded the clarinet, soprano, tenor saxophone, piano and the bass and drum parts for both songs, and then he recorded each track separately on top of one another to create two single tracks. The recordings were then issued as "Sidney Bechet's One Man Band".

The 1946 Disney animated film Make Mine Music includes overdubbed duo and trio performances by Nelson Eddy as an opera singing whale. The 1950 Disney film Cinderella used multiple tracks for vocals for the song "Oh, Sing Sweet Nightingale".

In 1948, experiments mixing sound effects and musical instruments made by Pierre Schaeffer at the Radio Télédiffusion Française experimental studio in Paris led to Étude aux Tourniquets, the first avant-garde composition using recording as a composition technique, recorded, and mixed directly on acetate records as tape recorders were not yet available. Similar sound collage experiments had been made by Edgard Varèse in the 1920s, but Varèse, also a French composer, wrote scores later played live by musicians. As from 1949, Schaeffer composed and recorded on acetates with Pierre Henry (Symphonie pour un homme seul, 1950), who also recorded with Varèse in 1954. Together, they used some of the earliest tape recorders available in the early 1950s.

The invention of magnetic tape opened up new possibilities for overdubbing, particularly with the development of multitrack recording with sel-sync. One of the first known commercially released overdubbed recordings was "Confess" for Mercury Records by Patti Page in 1948, although this overdubbing was done with acetate. With the popularity of this recording, Page recorded "With My Eyes Wide Open I'm Dreaming" using the same overdubbing technique. The vocals were listed as "Voices by: Patti Page, Patti Page, Patti Page, Patti Page".

Les Paul was an early innovator of overdubbing, and began to experiment with it around 1930. He originally created multi-track recordings by using a modified disk lathe to record several generations of sound on a single disk, before later using tape technology, having been given one of the first Ampex 300 series tape recorders as a gift from Bing Crosby. His 1950 #1 hit, "How High The Moon", performed with his then-wife Mary Ford, featured a then-significant amount of overdubbing, along with other studio techniques such as flanging, delay, phasing and vari-speed.

Les Paul's advancements in recording were seen in the adoption of his techniques by artists like Buddy Holly. In 1958, Holly released "Words of Love" and "Listen to Me", which were composed with overdubbing for added instrumentation and harmonies.

Peter Ustinov performed multiple voices on "Mock Mozart", in a recording produced by George Martin. Abbey Road Studios had no multitrack recorders at the time, so a pair of mono machines were used. Martin used the same process later for a Peter Sellers comedy record, this time using stereo machines and panning.

Ross Bagdasarian, also known as David Seville, combined overdubbing with tape speed manipulation to create "The Chipmunk Song," performing the voices of all three Chipmunks, Alvin, Simon, and Theodore, recorded to a half-normal-speed playback of the instrumental backup; and conversing with the singing rodents in his own voice, recorded at full speed.

== Examples ==
Overdubs can be made for a variety of reasons. One of the most obvious is for convenience; for example, if a bass guitarist were temporarily unavailable, the recording can be made and the bass track added later. Similarly, if only one or two guitarists are available, but a song calls for multiple guitar parts, a guitarist can play both lead and rhythm guitar. Overdubbing is also used to solidify a weak singer; double tracking allows a singer with poor intonation to sound more in tune. (The opposite of this is often used with sampled instruments; detuning the sample slightly can make the sound more lifelike.) The effect is used to give one singer a fuller sound. They would effectively harmonize with their own vocals, like a choir but with just one voice.

Overdubbing has sometimes been viewed negatively, when it is seen as being used to artificially enhance the musical skills of an artist or group, such as with studio-recorded inserts to live recordings, or backing tracks created by session musicians instead of the credited performers. The early records of the Monkees were made by groups of studio musicians pre-recording songs (often in a different studio, and some before the band was even formed), which were later overdubbed with the Monkees' vocals. While the songs became hits, this practice drew criticism. Michael Nesmith in particular disliked what overdubbing did to the integrity of the band's music. Additionally, in working with producer Butch Vig, Kurt Cobain had expressed a disdain for double-track recording. Vig had to reportedly convince Cobain to use the recording technique by saying, "The Beatles did it on everything. John Lennon loved the sound of his voice double-tracked."

On Raffi's 1988 live special, "Raffi in Concert With the Rise and Shine Band", the overdubbed backing track played over the closing credits turns out to be the instrumental cover of his song, "Just Like the Sun", taken from this 1987 album, "Everything Grows".

In December 2023 Paul McCartney put the concept of overdubbing in the spotlight by re-releasing an underdubbed version of the Paul McCartney and Wings album Band on the Run. The underdubbed tracks highlight the bare-bones nature of the album's original recordings made in the EMI Records studio in Lagos, Nigeria before additional instruments were added in London.

Paulinho da Costa's song "Ritmo Number One" from his 1977 album Agora uses a base track with surdo (big bass drum) and percussion, overdubbed with 8 percussion tracks (repique, pandeiro, congas, tamborims, a-go-go, cuíca, bell tree, reco-reco).

== See also ==
- AMPEX
- Auto-Tune
- Dub (disambiguation)
- Dubbing (music)
- Dubbing (filmmaking)
- Multitrack recording
- Punch in/out
- Recording studio as an instrument
- Music tracker
