= Status Summit =

American media industry conference

- Date: September 9, 2026
- Venue: The Times Center
- Location: Manhattan, New York City, United States
- Type: Media-industry conference
- Organized by: Status
- Website: www.statussummit.news

The Status Summit is an annual media industry conference founded by journalist Oliver Darcy, organized through his media newsletter and company Status. The inaugural edition was held on September 9, 2026, at the Times Center in Manhattan, New York City. The summit brought together media executives, journalists, and industry figures for panel discussions on topics including artificial intelligence's impact on journalism, the shift of broadcast talent to independent platforms, and the business pressures facing news organizations.

== Background ==
Darcy announced the Status Summit in July 2026, describing it as a one-day event intended to bring together "the industry's most influential executives, journalists, creators, and decision-makers for a series of candid, newsmaking conversations about the forces transforming the information landscape."

== 2026 summit ==
The inaugural Status Summit took place on September 9, 2026. Confirmed speakers included Meredith Kopit Levien (president and CEO of The New York Times), Nicholas Thompson (CEO of The Atlantic), Rebecca Kutler (president of MS NOW), David Remnick (editor of The New Yorker), Wendy McMahon (former CBS News and Stations chief), Don Lemon, Nicolle Wallace, Brian Williams, Kaitlan Collins, Andrew Ross Sorkin, Mehdi Hasan, Kara Swisher, and Julie Pace (executive editor of the Associated Press).

== Panels and discussions ==
Several panels addressed the news industry's relationship with generative AI companies. Kopit Levien said AI developers had "engaged in theft of intellectual property and creative expressive work on a scale that is unprecedented," referencing The New York Times's ongoing litigation against OpenAI and Microsoft. Thompson said AI was likely to "turn [the] business upside down" for publishers, noting that The Atlantic's search traffic had declined as Google shifted toward AI-based search interfaces. A separate panel examined the migration of television anchors to independent media. Lemon and Hasan, both of whom left major networks to found independent outlets, discussed audience growth and editorial independence outside traditional corporate structures.

== See also ==
- Oliver Darcy
- Status (newsletter)
