= PEG-16 macadamia glycerides =

Names
- Other names: Polyethylene glycol (16) macadamia glycerides; Polyoxyethylene (16) macadamia glycerides

Identifiers
CAS Number	220459-99-4
ECHA InfoCard	100.112.420

Properties
Chemical formula	Variable
Molar mass	Variable
- Except where otherwise noted, data are given for materials in their standard state (at 25 °C [77 °F], 100 kPa). Infobox references

PEG-16 macadamia glycerides is the polyethylene glycol derivative of the mono- and diglycerides derived from macadamia nut oil by ethoxylation with an average of 16 ethylene glycol units. PEG-16 macadamia glycerides are commonly used in cosmetic formulations as an emollient, refatting agent, conditioner, solubilizer, and secondary emulsifier.
