= Material implication =

Material implication may refer to:

- Material conditional, a logical connective
- Material implication (rule of inference), a rule of replacement for some propositional logics

== See also ==
- Implication (disambiguation)
- Conditional statement (disambiguation)
