= State information =

State information refers to the "information state" of a system, designed or made for using such information.

== Physics ==
- In classical mechanics, state is a complete description of a system in terms of parameters such as positions and momentums at a particular moment in time
- Quantum state, in physics, the state of a quantum mechanical system given by a vector in the underlying Hilbert space
- Excited state
- Dynamical systems, a concept in mathematics where a fixed rule describes the time dependence of a point in a geometrical space
- Stationary state, an eigenvector of a Hamiltonian
- Thermodynamic state, a set of physical quantities (e.g. temperature, pressure, and composition) describing variable properties of a given thermodynamic system

== Computer science ==
- State (computer science), a unique configuration of information in a program or machine

== See also ==
- State (disambiguation)
