= Monastic state =

Monastic state may refer to:

- Monastic community of Mount Athos
- Monastic State of the Teutonic Order
- Monastic State of the Livonian Order
- Monastic State of the Knights Hospitaller

== See also ==
- Abbatial states of the Holy Roman Empire
- State (disambiguation)
