= The Statement =

The Statement may refer to:

- The Statement (novel), a 1995 novel by Brian Moore
- The Statement (2003 film), a film by Norman Jewison, based on Brian Moore's novel

== See also ==
- Statement (disambiguation)
