= Saddle soap =

Leather cleaning compound

Saddle soap is a compound used for cleaning, conditioning, and protecting leather. It typically contains mild soap, softening ingredients such as lanolin, and preservatives such as beeswax. It is commonly used on leather footwear, saddles, and other items of horse tack, hence its name.

== See also ==
- Dubbin
- Neatsfoot oil
- Mink oil
- Shoe polish
