= Status (newsletter) =

American media industry newsletter

- Editor: Oliver Darcy
- Categories: Media and entertainment
- Frequency: Daily
- First issue: August 12, 2024
- Company: Status
- Country: United States
- Language: English
- Website: www.status.news

Status is an American subscription-based newsletter and media company covering the news industry, Hollywood, and Silicon Valley. It was founded by journalist Oliver Darcy in August 2024 after he left CNN, where he had written the network's Reliable Sources media newsletter.

== History ==
=== Founding ===
Darcy announced his departure from CNN on August 8, 2024, saying he would launch an independent, subscription-based news outlet dedicated to media industry coverage. The first edition of Status was published on August 12, 2024. At launch, subscriptions started at $15 per month or $150 per year, with a premium "elite" tier priced at $595 annually that included perks such as private video calls with Darcy.

Status began as a one-person operation, with Darcy writing, editing, and publishing the newsletter himself. Darcy has said his goal from the outset was to build "an actual media publication with other voices" rather than a single-author newsletter.

=== Growth and staffing ===
Jon Passatino, Oliver Darcy, Natalie Korach, and Brett LoGiurato

Jon Passantino, a former CNN colleague of Darcy's, joined Status as executive editor in early 2025. By July 2025, the newsletter had grown to approximately 85,000 subscribers. In September 2025, Status hired Brian Lowry, a former Variety and CNN critic, as Hollywood correspondent and editor, and Natalie Korach, formerly of Vanity Fair, as a media correspondent, expanding the newsletter's publishing schedule to seven days a week. Brett LoGiurato later joined as deputy editor.

On July 11, 2025, Status launched Power Lines, a weekly video and audio program co-hosted by Darcy and Passantino, produced by In the Arena Studios and distributed on YouTube, Spotify, and Apple Podcasts. By August 2026, Status's combined free and paid subscriber base had grown substantially since launch, and its YouTube channel had surpassed 100,000 subscribers.

=== Status Summit ===
In 2026, Darcy announced the Status Summit, an in-person media industry conference. The inaugural edition was held on September 9, 2026, in New York City, featuring media industry speakers and panels.

== Content and coverage ==
Status publishes a newsletter covering the media industry, including television news, Hollywood, Silicon Valley, and the business of journalism. Darcy has described Status's editorial approach as avoiding "bothsidesism" and aiming to state conclusions in "plain language" that other outlets avoid.

== Reception ==
A 2025 case study by the newsletter platform beehiiv credited Status with reaching more than 70,000 subscribers within six months of launch through scoop-driven reporting and tiered subscription offerings. Darcy has made on-air appearances on outlets including PBS NewsHour and Connecticut Public Radio discussing reporting from Status.

== See also ==
- Oliver Darcy
- Reliable Sources
