= Statement =

Statement or statements may refer to:

== Common uses ==
- Statement (computer science), the smallest standalone element of an imperative programming language
- Statement (logic and semantics), declarative sentence that is either true or false
- Statement, a declarative phrase in language (linguistics)
- Statement, a North American paper size of 5 1/2 in × 8 in (140 mm × 203 mm), also known under various names such as half letter and memo
- Financial statement, formal summary of the financial activities of a business, person, or other entity
- Mathematical statement, a statement in logic and mathematics
- Political statement, any act or nonverbal form of communication that is intended to influence a decision to be made for or by a group
- Press statement, written or recorded communication directed at members of the news media
- Statement of Special Educational Needs, outlining specific provision needed for a child in England
- Witness statement (law), a signed document recording the evidence given by a person with testimony relevant to an incident
- A written ministerial statement to Parliament in the United Kingdom

== Music ==
- Statements (album), a 1962 album by the jazz vibraphonist Milt Jackson
- "Statement" (song), a 2008 song by the band Boris
- "Statement", a song by NF from the album Therapy Session
- "Statements" (song), a 2017 song by Loreen

== See also ==
- The Statement (disambiguation)
- Sentence (disambiguation)
  - Sentence (linguistics), words grouped meaningfully to express a statement, question, exclamation, request, command or suggestion
- State (disambiguation)
- Theme (music), a statement in music
- Wikidata:Help:Statements
