= Conditioning =

Conditioning may refer to:

== Science, computing, and technology ==
- Air conditioning, the removal of heat from indoor air for thermal comfort
  - Automobile air conditioning, air conditioning in a vehicle
  - Ice storage air conditioning, air conditioning using ice storage
  - Solar air conditioning, air conditioning using solar power
- Beer conditioning, maturation, clarification, and stabilisation of beer
  - Bottle conditioning, above conditioning after bottling
- Chemical conditioning, improvement and stabilization chemical components
- Data conditioning, the use of data management techniques in a computer system
- Flow conditioning, the study of the movement of fluids in pipes
- Signal conditioning, manipulating an analog signal in such a way that it meets the requirements of the next stage

== Biology and physical fitness ==
- Aerobic conditioning, exercise which trains the heart and lungs to pump blood more efficiently
- Body conditioning via physical exercise

== Learning ==
- Classical conditioning or Pavlovian conditioning, a behavioral mechanism in which one stimulus comes to signal the occurrence of a second stimulus
  - Eyeblink conditioning, classical conditioning involving pairing of a stimulus with an eyeblink-eliciting stimulus
  - Fear conditioning, classical conditioning involving aversive stimuli
  - Second-order conditioning, a two-step process in classical conditioning
  - Evaluative conditioning, a form of learning in which attitude towards one stimulus is learnt by its pairing with a second stimulus
- Covert conditioning, classical and operant conditioning in mental health treatment
- Operant conditioning or instrumental conditioning, a form of learning in which behavior is modified by its consequences
  - Social conditioning, operant conditioning training individuals to act in a society

== Mathematics ==
- Condition number also known as Conditioning (numerical analysis), a quantity describing whether or not a numerical problem is well-behaved
- Conditioning (probability), a concept in probability theory

== See also ==
- Conditioning regimens in transplantation
- Search for "Conditioning"
