= Sentence =

Sentence(s) or The Sentence may refer to:

== Common uses ==
- Sentence (law), a punishment imposed on a person who has been convicted in court of a criminal offence
- Sentence (linguistics), a grammatical unit of language
- Sentence (mathematical logic), a formula not containing free variables

== Arts, entertainment, and media ==
- Sentence (music), a type of musical phrase
- Sentence (liturgy), a short biblical phrase within Anglican liturgy
- Sentences, a 12th-century theological book by Peter Lombard
- Sentences (Muhly), a 2014 oratorio by Nico Muhly
- Sentences: The Life of MF Grimm, a 2007 autobiographical graphic novel by MF Grimm
- The Sentence (2018 film), a documentary by Rudy Valdez
- The Sentence (upcoming film), a drama film directed by Miguel del Arco
- The Sentence (novel), a 2021 novel by Louise Erdrich
- "The Sentence" (The Outer Limits), an episode of the TV series The Outer Limits
- The Sentence, a 2016 novel and performance piece by Alistair Fruish

== See also ==
- Sentenced, a former Finnish metal band
- Sentenced (film), a 2026 documentary film made by Stephen Curry
- Statement (disambiguation)
