= Implicit =

Implicit may refer to:

== Mathematics ==
- Implicit function
- Implicit function theorem
- Implicit curve
- Implicit surface
- Implicit differential equation

== Other uses ==
- Implicit assumption, in logic
- Implicit-association test, in social psychology
- Implicit bit, in floating-point arithmetic
- Implicit learning, in learning psychology
- Implicit memory, in long-term human memory
- Implicit solvation, in computational chemistry
- Implicit stereotype (implicit bias), in social identity theory
- Implicit type conversion, in computing

== See also ==
- Implicit and explicit atheism, types of atheism coined by George H. Smith
- Implication (disambiguation)
- Implicature
