= Conditional =

Conditional (if then) may refer to:

- Causal conditional, if X then Y, where X is a cause of Y
- Conditional probability, the probability of an event A given that another event B
- Conditional proof, in logic: a proof that asserts a conditional, and proves that the antecedent leads to the consequent
- Material conditional, in propositional calculus, or logical calculus in mathematics
- Relevance conditional, in relevance logic
- Conditional logic, referring to logics for studying natural-language conditional sentences (cf. § Grammar and linguistics below)
- Conditional (computer programming), a statement or expression in computer programming languages
- A conditional expression in computer programming languages such as ?:
- Conditions in a contract

== Grammar and linguistics ==
- Conditional mood (or conditional tense), a verb form in many languages
- Conditional sentence, a sentence type used to refer to hypothetical situations and their consequences
  - Indicative conditional, a conditional sentence expressing "if A then B" in a natural language
  - Counterfactual conditional, a conditional sentence indicating what would be the case if its antecedent were true

== Other ==
- "Conditional" (Laura Mvula song)
- Conditional jockey, an apprentice jockey in British or Irish National Hunt racing
- Conditional short-circuit current
- Conditional Value-at-Risk

== See also ==
- Condition (disambiguation)
- Conditional statement (disambiguation)
