= Conditional statement =

A conditional statement may refer to:

- A conditional formula in logic and mathematics, which can be interpreted as:
  - Material conditional
  - Strict conditional
  - Variably strict conditional
  - Relevance conditional
- A conditional sentence in natural language, including:
  - Indicative conditional
  - Counterfactual conditional
  - Biscuit conditional
- Conditional (computer programming), a conditional statement in a computer programming language

== See also ==
- Condition (disambiguation)
- Conditional (disambiguation)
- Logical biconditional
- Logical consequence
