= The States (disambiguation) =

The States is an informal name for the United States.

The States may also refer to:

- The Estates, a representative assembly in many (feudal) historical countries
- The States Assembly, the legislative body of Jersey
- The States General of the Netherlands, the legislative body of the Netherlands
- The States of Guernsey, the government and legislature of Guernsey
- The States (TV series), 2007 documentary television series

== See also ==
- State (disambiguation)
