= Stateless =

Stateless may refer to:

== Society ==
- Anarchism, a political philosophy opposed to the institution of the state
- Stateless communism, which Karl Marx predicted would be the final phase of communism
- Stateless nation, a group of people without a nation-state
- Stateless society, a society that is not governed by a state
- Statelessness, the legal and social concept applicable to persons who are not citizens or subjects of any state

== Computing ==
- State (computer science), relating to the configuration of information
- Stateless protocol, a communications protocol that treats each request as an independent transaction that is unrelated to any previous request
- Stateless firewall, that treats each network frame (or packet) in isolation
- Stateless IP/ICMP Translation algorithm, an IPv6 translation mechanism

== Music ==
- Stateless (Lene Lovich album), 1978
- Stateless (band), an English electronica band
  - Stateless (Stateless album), 2007
- Stateless (Unwed Sailor album), 2002
- "Stateless", a song by U2 from The Million Dollar Hotel: Music from the Motion Picture
- Stateless (Dirty Beaches album), 2014

== Film and television ==
- Stateless (TV series), a 2019 Australian drama series
- Stateless (film), a 2020 Canadian documentary films

== See also ==
- State (disambiguation)
