= Implication =

Implication may refer to:

== Logic ==
- Logical consequence (also entailment or logical implication), the relationship between statements that holds true when one logically "follows from" one or more others
- Material conditional (also material implication), a logical connective and binary truth function typically interpreted as "If p, then q"
  - Material implication (rule of inference), a logical rule of replacement
  - Implicational propositional calculus, a version of classical propositional calculus that uses only the material conditional connective
- Strict conditional or strict implication, a connective of modal logic that expresses necessity
- modus ponens, or implication elimination, a simple argument form and rule of inference summarized as "p implies q; p is asserted to be true, so therefore q must be true"

== Linguistics ==
- Implicature, what is suggested in an utterance, even though neither expressed nor strictly implied
- Implicational universal or linguistic universal, a pattern that occurs systematically across natural languages
  - Implicational hierarchy, a chain of implicational universals; if a language has one property then it also has other properties in the chain
- Entailment (pragmatics) or strict implication, the relationship between two sentences where the truth of one requires the truth of the other

== Other uses ==
- Implication table, a tool used to facilitate the minimization of states in a state machine
- Implication graph, a skew-symmetric directed graph used for analyzing complex Boolean expressions
- Implication (information science)

== See also ==
- Material implication (disambiguation)
- Implicit (disambiguation)
