= Dubbins =

Dubbins or Dubbin is a surname. Notable people with the name include

- Andrew Dubbins, journalist
- Don Dubbins (1928–1991), American actor of film and television
- Tony Dubbins (fl. 1984–2008), British trade unionist
- Murray Dubbin (born 1929), American politician from Florida
- Sam Dubbin (born 1955), American lawyer, public servant, and advocate

== See also ==
- Dubbin, wax product for leather and other materials
