= Leather =

Durable and flexible material created by tanning animal skins

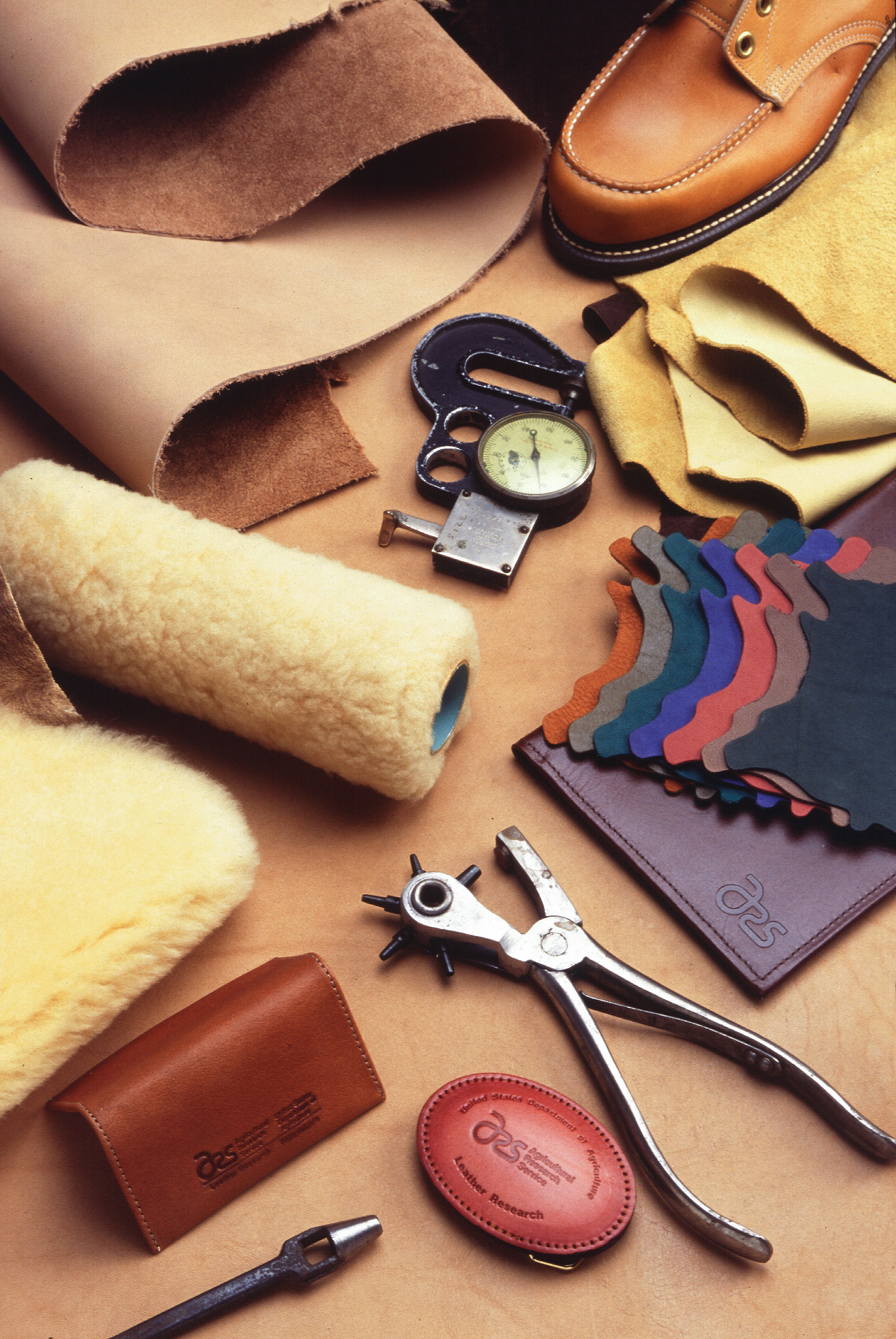
A variety of leather products and leather-working tools

Leather is a strong, flexible and durable material obtained from the tanning, or chemical treatment, of animal skins and hides to prevent decay. The most common leathers come from cattle, sheep, goats, equine animals, buffalo, pigs and hogs, ostriches, and aquatic animals such as seals and alligators.

Leather can be used to make a variety of items, including clothing, footwear, handbags, furniture, tools and sports equipment, and lasts for decades. Leather making has been practiced for more than 7,000 years and the leading producers of leather today are China and India.

Critics of tanneries claim that they engage in unsustainable practices that pose health hazards to the people and the environment near them.

== Production processes ==
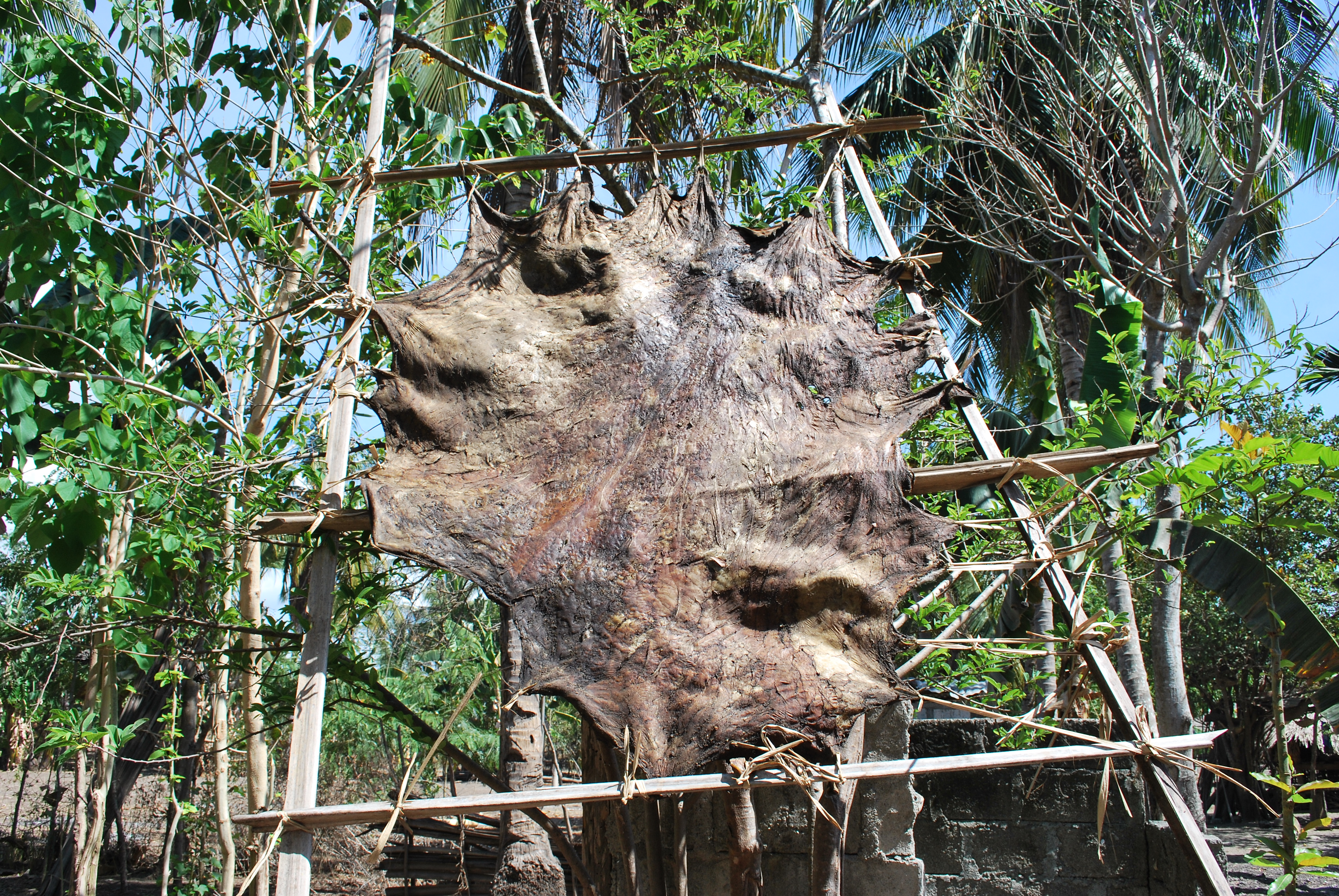
Leather tanning in Timor-Leste

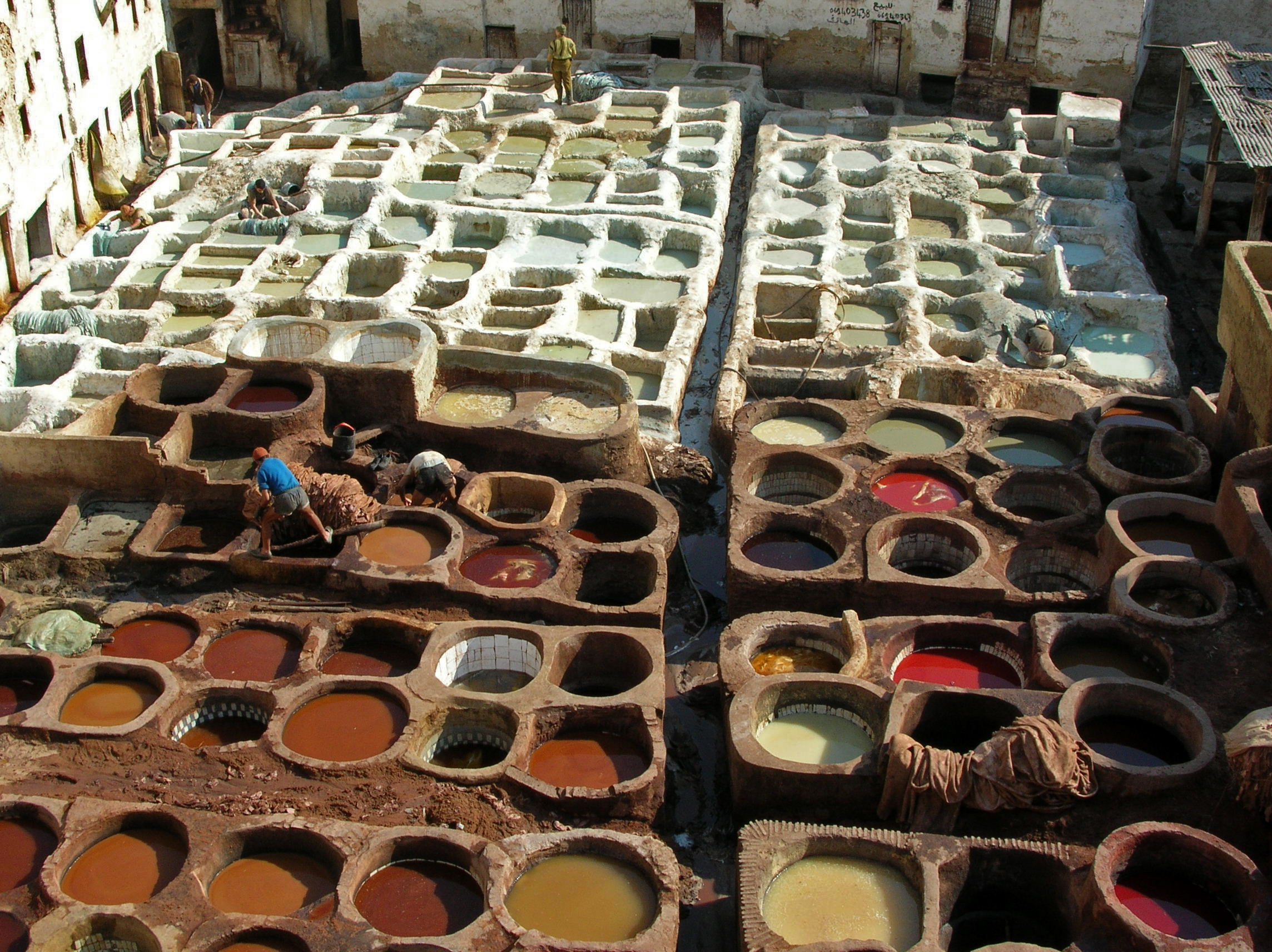
Ancient leather tanning in Fez, Morocco

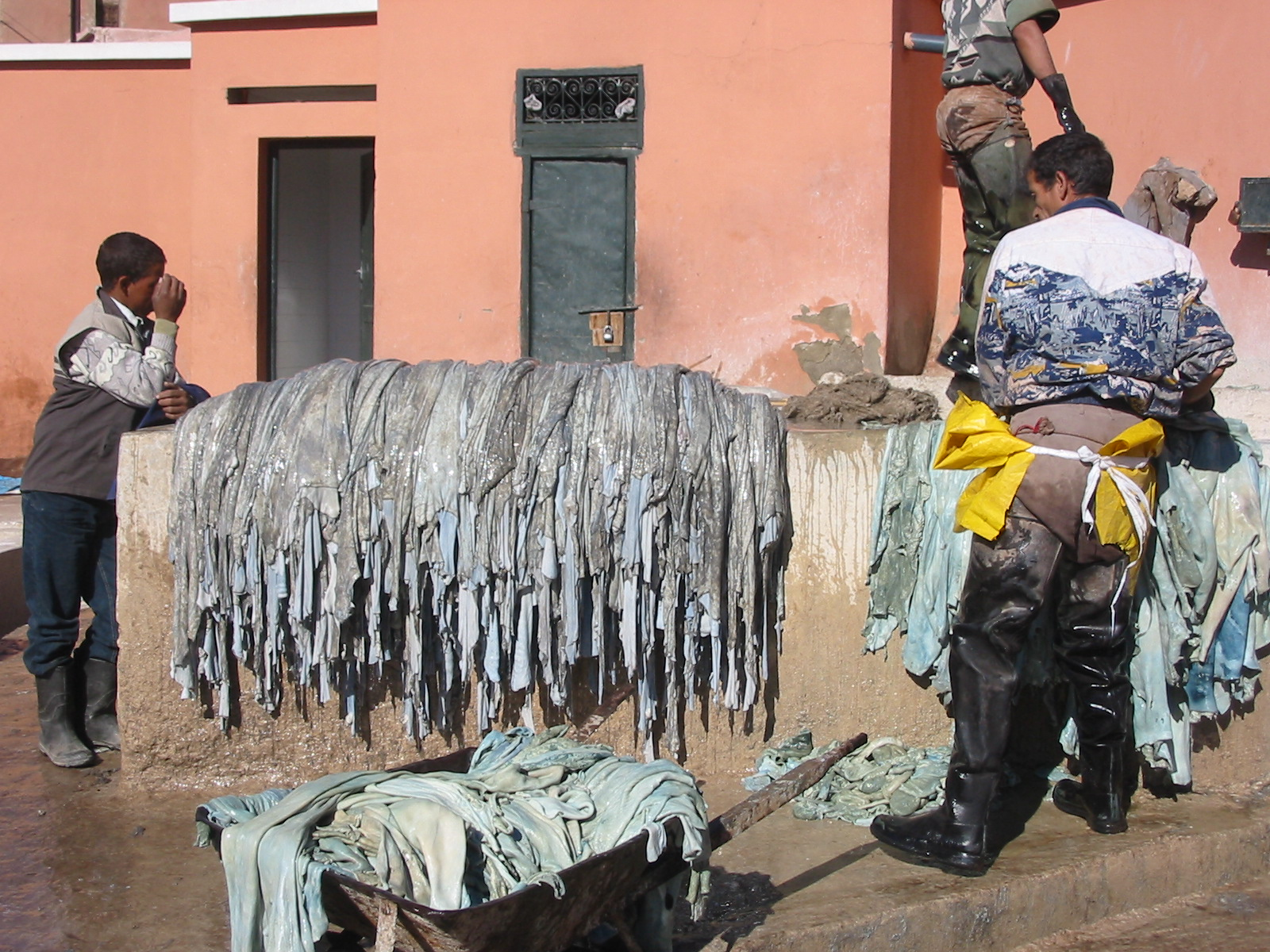
Tanned leather in Marrakesh

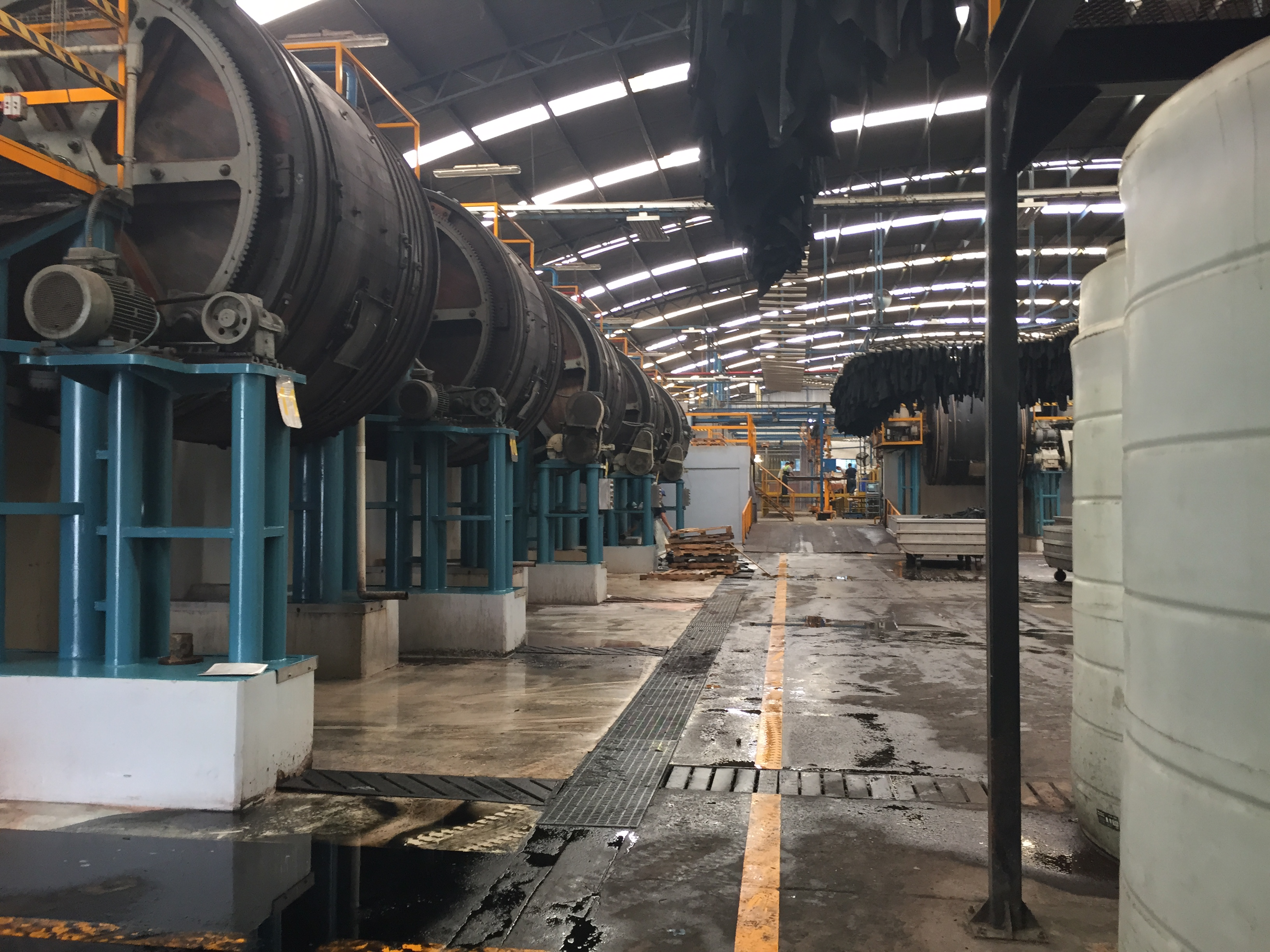
Modern-day tannery in León, Mexico

The leather manufacturing process is divided into three fundamental subprocesses: preparatory stages, tanning, and crusting. A further subprocess, finishing, can be added into the leather process sequence, but not all leathers receive finishing.

The preparatory stages are when the hide is prepared for tanning. Preparatory stages may include soaking, hair removal, liming, deliming, bating, bleaching, and pickling.

Tanning is a process that stabilizes the proteins, particularly collagen, of the raw hide to increase the thermal, chemical and microbiological stability of the hides and skins, making it suitable for a wide variety of end applications. The principal difference between raw and tanned hides is that raw hides dry out to form a hard, inflexible material that, when rewetted, will putrefy, while tanned material dries to a flexible form that does not become putrid when rewetted.

Many tanning methods and materials exist. The typical process sees tanners load the hides into a drum and immerse them in a tank that contains the tanning "liquor". The hides soak while the drum slowly rotates about its axis, and the tanning liquor slowly penetrates through the full thickness of the hide. Once the process achieves even penetration, workers slowly raise the liquor's pH in a process called basification, which fixes the tanning material to the leather. The more tanning material fixed, the higher the leather's hydrothermal stability and shrinkage temperature resistance.

Crusting is a process that thins and lubricates leather. It often includes a coloring operation. Chemicals added during crusting must be fixed in place. Crusting culminates with a drying and softening operation, and may include splitting, shaving, dyeing, whitening or other methods.

For some leathers, tanners apply a surface coating, called "finishing". Finishing operations can include oiling, brushing, buffing, coating, polishing, embossing, glazing, or tumbling, among others.

Leather can be oiled to improve its water resistance. This currying process after tanning supplements the natural oils remaining in the leather itself, which can be washed out through repeated exposure to water. Frequent oiling of leather, with mink oil, neatsfoot oil, or a similar material keeps it supple and improves its lifespan dramatically.

=== Tanning methods ===
Tanning processes largely differ in which chemicals are used in the tanning liquor. Some common types include:

- Vegetable-tanned leather is tanned using tannins extracted from vegetable matter, such as tree bark prepared in bark mills. It is the oldest known method. It is supple and light brown in color, with the exact shade depending on the mix of materials and the color of the skin. The color tan derives its name from the appearance of undyed vegetable-tanned leather. Vegetable-tanned leather is not stable in water; it tends to discolor, and if left to soak and then dry, it shrinks and becomes harder, a feature of vegetable-tanned leather that is exploited in traditional shoemaking. In hot water, it shrinks drastically and partly congeals, becoming rigid and eventually brittle. Boiled leather is an example of this, where the leather has been hardened by being immersed in boiling water, or in wax or similar substances. Historically, it was occasionally used as armor after hardening, and it has also been used for book binding.
- Chrome-tanned leather is tanned using chromium sulfate and other chromium salts. It is also known as "wet blue" for the pale blue color of the undyed leather. The chrome tanning method usually takes approximately one day to complete, making it best suited for large-scale industrial use. This is the most common method in modern use. It is more supple and pliable than vegetable-tanned leather and does not discolor or lose shape as drastically in water as vegetable-tanned. However, there are environmental concerns with this tanning method, as chromium is a heavy metal; while the trivalent chromium used for tanning is harmless, other byproducts can contain toxic variants. The method was developed in the latter half of the 19th century as tanneries wanted to find ways to speed up the process and to make leather more waterproof.
- Aldehyde-tanned leather is tanned using glutaraldehyde or oxazolidine compounds. It is referred to as "wet white" due to its pale cream color. It is the main type of "chrome-free" leather, often seen in shoes for infants and automobiles. Formaldehyde has been used for tanning in the past; it is being phased out due to danger to workers and sensitivity of many people to formaldehyde. Chamois leather is a form of aldehyde-tanned leather that is porous and highly water-absorbent. Chamois leather is made using oil (traditionally cod oil) that oxidizes to produce the aldehydes that tan the leather.
- Brain tanned leathers are made by a labor-intensive process that uses emulsified oils, often those of animal brains such as deer, cattle, and buffalo. An example of this kind is buckskin. Leather products made in this manner are known for their exceptional softness and washability.
- Alum leather is transformed using aluminium salts mixed with a variety of binders and protein sources, such as flour and egg yolk. Alum leather is not actually tanned; rather the process is called "tawing", and the resulting material reverts to rawhide if soaked in water long enough to remove the alum salts.

== Grades ==
In general, leather is produced in the following grades:

- Top-grain leather includes the outer layer of the hide, known as the grain, which features finer, more densely packed fibers, resulting in strength and durability. Depending on thickness, it may also contain some of the more fibrous under layer, known as the corium. Types of top-grain leather include:
  - Full-grain leather contains the entire grain layer, without any removal of the surface. Rather than wearing out, it develops a patina during its useful lifetime. It is usually considered the highest quality leather. Furniture and footwear are often made from full-grain leather. Full-grain leather is typically finished with a soluble aniline dye. Russia leather is a form of full-grain leather.
  - Corrected grain leather has the surface subjected to finishing treatments to create a more uniform appearance. This usually involves buffing or sanding away flaws in the grain, then dyeing and embossing the surface.
  - Nubuck is top-grain leather that has been sanded or buffed on the grain side to give a slight nap of short protein fibers, producing a velvet-like surface.
- Split leather is created from the corium left once the top-grain has been separated from the hide, known as the drop split. In thicker hides, the drop split can be further split into a middle split and a flesh split.
  - Bicast leather is split leather that is coated with a layer of polyurethane or vinyl with an embossed texture. This gives it the appearance of a grain. It is slightly stiffer than top-grain leather but has a more consistent texture.
  - Patent leather is leather that has been given a high-gloss finish by the addition of a coating. Dating to the late 1700s, it became widely popular after inventor Seth Boyden developed the first mass-production process, using a linseed-oil-based lacquer, in 1818. Modern versions are usually a form of bicast leather.
  - Suede is made from the underside of a split to create a soft, napped finish. It is often made from younger or smaller animals, as the skins of adults often result in a coarse, shaggy nap.
- Bonded leather, also called reconstituted leather, is a material that uses leather scraps that are shredded and bonded together with polyurethane or latex onto a fiber mesh. The amount of leather fibers in the mix varies from 10% to 90%, affecting the properties of the product.

The term "genuine leather" does not describe a specific grade. The term often indicates split leather that has been extensively processed, and some sources describe it as synonymous with bicast leather, or made from multiple splits glued together and coated. In some countries, when it is the description on a product label the term means nothing more than "contains leather"; depending on jurisdiction, regulations limit the term's use in product labelling.

== Animals used ==
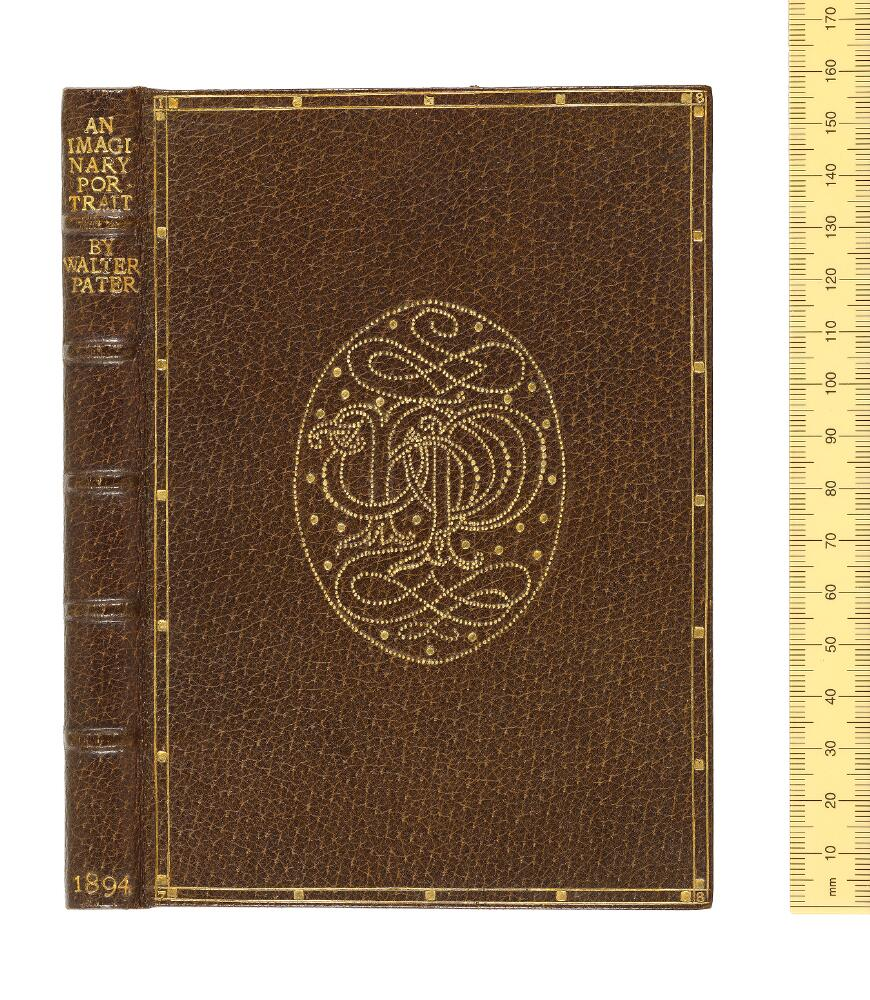
A book bound in pigskin

Today, most leather is made of cattle (cow) hides, which constitute about 65% of all leather produced. Other animals that are used include sheep (about 13%), goats (about 11%), and pigs (about 10%). Obtaining accurate figures from around the world is difficult, especially for areas where the skin may be eaten. There are significant regional differences in leather production: e.g. goat leather was historically called "Turkey" or "Morocco" due to its association with the Middle East, while pig skin had historically been used the most in Germany. Other animals mentioned below only constitute a fraction of a percent of total leather production.

Horse hides are used to make particularly durable leathers. Shell cordovan is a horse leather made not from the outer skin but from an under layer, found only in equine species, called the shell. It is prized for its mirror-like finish and anti-creasing properties.

Lamb and deerskin are used for soft leather in more expensive apparel. Deerskin is widely used in work gloves and indoor shoes.

Reptilian skins, such as alligator, crocodile, and snake, are noted for their distinct patterns that reflect the scales of their species. This has led to hunting and farming of these species in part for their skins. The Argentine black and white tegu is one of the most exploited reptile species in the world in the leather trade. However, it is not endangered and while monitored, trade is legal in most South American countries.

Kangaroo leather is used to make items that must be strong and flexible. It is the material most commonly used in bullwhips. Some motorcyclists favor kangaroo leather for motorcycle leathers because of its light weight and abrasion resistance. Kangaroo leather is also used for falconry jesses, soccer footwear, (e.g. Adidas Copa Mundial) and boxing speed bags.

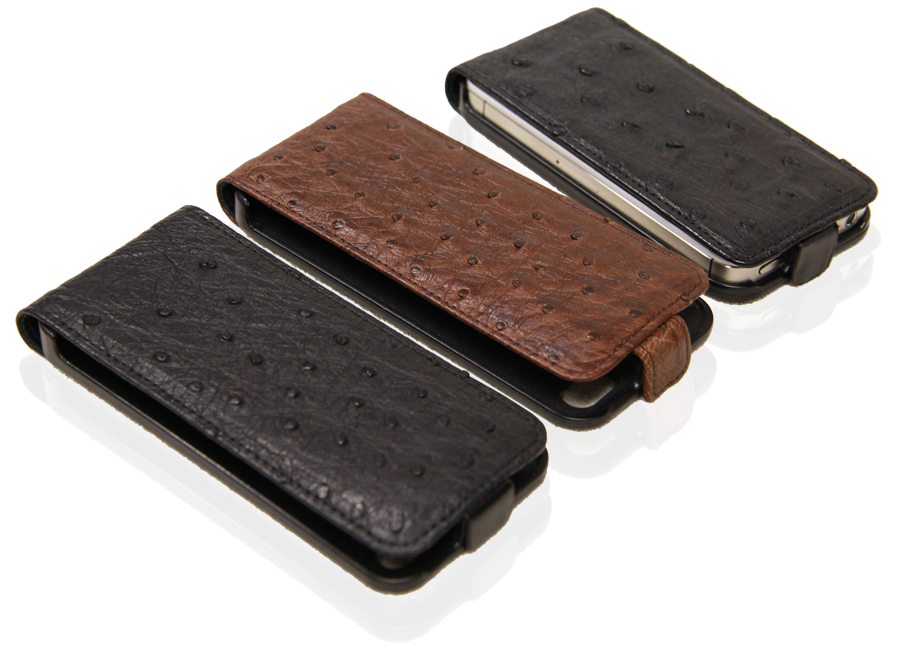
Phone cases in ostrich leather

Although originally raised for their feathers in the 19th century, ostriches are now more popular for both meat and leather. Ostrich leather has a characteristic "goose bump" look because of the large follicles where the feathers grew. Different processes produce different finishes for many applications, including upholstery, footwear, automotive products, accessories, and clothing.

In Thailand, stingray leather is used in wallets and belts. Stingray leather is tough and durable. The leather is often dyed black and covered with tiny round bumps in the natural pattern of the back ridge of an animal. These bumps are then usually dyed white to highlight the decoration. Stingray rawhide is also used as grips on Chinese swords, Scottish basket hilted swords, and Japanese katanas. Stingray leather is also used for high abrasion areas in motorcycle racing leathers (especially in gloves, where its high abrasion resistance helps prevent wear through in the event of an accident).

For a given thickness, fish leather is typically much stronger due to its criss-crossed fibers.

Production of cattle hides

Production of cattle hides per animal

== Environmental impact ==
Leather produces some environmental impact, most notably due to:

- The carbon footprint of cattle rearing (see environmental impact of meat production)
- Use of chemicals in the tanning process (e.g., chromium, phthalate esters, nonyl phenol ethoxylate soaps, pentachlorophenol and solvents)
- Air pollution due to the transformation process (hydrogen sulfide is formed during mixing with acids and ammonia liberated during deliming, solvent vapors)

=== Carbon footprint ===
Estimates of the carbon footprint of bovine leather range from 65 to 150 kg of CO_{2} equivalent per square meter of production.

=== Water footprint ===
One ton of hide or skin generally produces 20 to 80 m^{3} of waste water, including chromium levels of 100–400 mg/L, sulfide levels of 200–800 mg/L, high levels of fat and other solid wastes, and notable pathogen contamination. Producers often add pesticides to protect hides during transport. With solid wastes representing up to 70% of the wet weight of the original hides, the tanning process represents a considerable strain on water treatment installations.

=== Disposal ===
Leather takes 25 to 40 years to decompose. This is much longer than cotton clothing which decomposes in about 6 months, but much shorter than plastics which take hundreds of years or more to decompose.

=== Chemical waste disposal ===
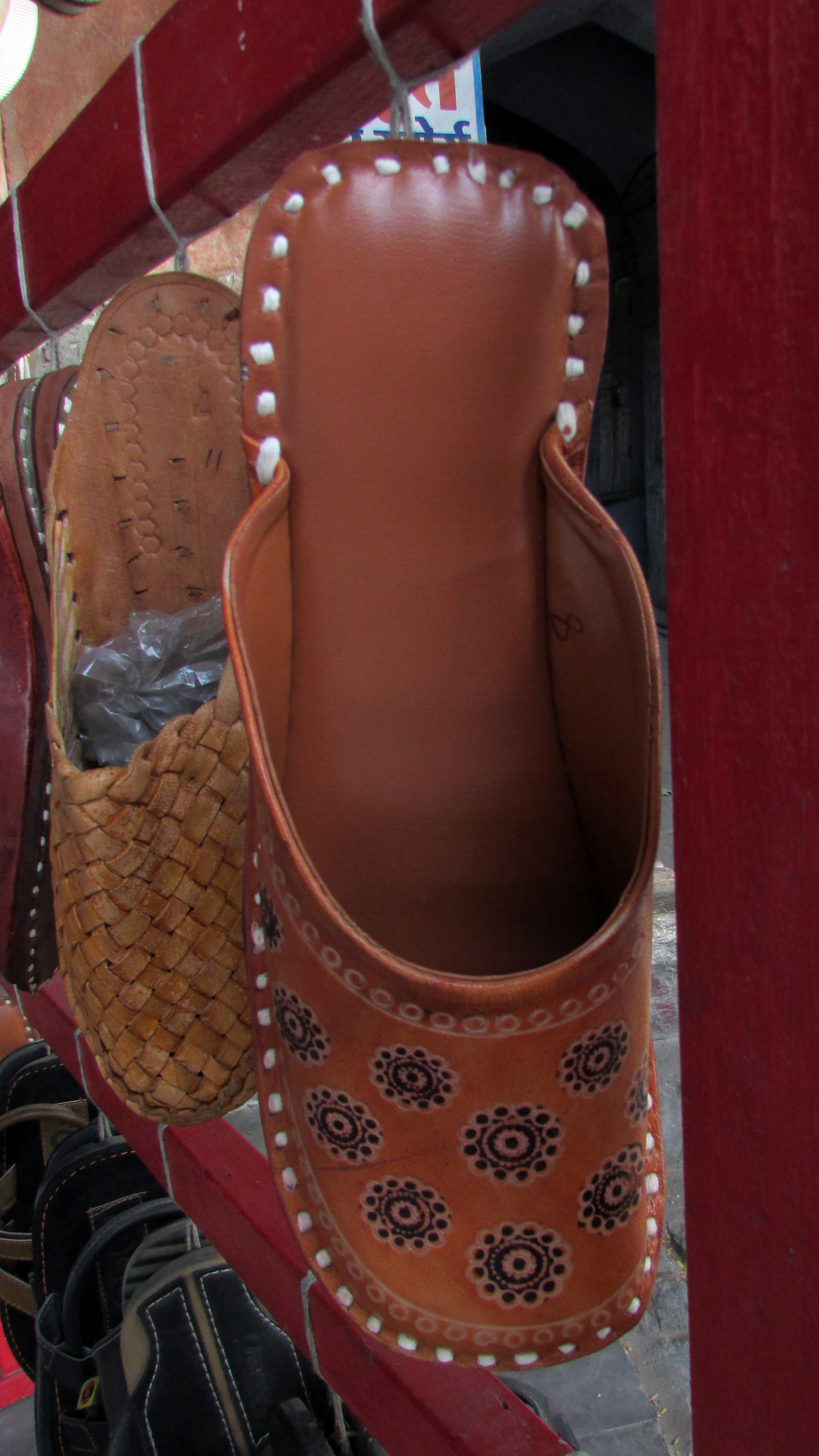
Rajasthani-style leather jooti from Jaipur, India

Tanning is especially polluting in countries where environmental regulations are lax, such as in India, the world's third-largest producer and exporter of leather. To give an example of an efficient pollution prevention system, chromium loads per produced tonne are generally abated from 8 kg to 1.5 kg. VOC emissions are typically reduced from 30 kg/t to 2 kg/t in a properly managed facility. A review of the total pollution load decrease achievable according to the United Nations Industrial Development Organization posts precise data on the abatement achievable through industrially proven low-waste advanced methods, while noting, "even though the chrome pollution load can be decreased by 94% on introducing advanced technologies, the minimum residual load 0.15 kg/t raw hide can still cause difficulties when using landfills and composting sludge from wastewater treatment on account of the regulations currently in force in some countries."

In Kanpur, the self-proclaimed "Leather City of World"—with 10,000 tanneries as of 2011 and a city of three million on the banks of the Ganges—pollution levels were so high, that despite an industry crisis, the pollution control board decided to shut down 49 high-polluting tanneries out of 404 in July 2009. In 2003 for instance, the main tanneries' effluent disposal unit was dumping 22 tonnes of chromium-laden solid waste per day in the open.

In the Hazaribagh neighborhood of Dhaka in Bangladesh, chemicals from tanneries end up in Dhaka's main river. Besides the environmental damage, the health of both local factory workers and the end consumer is also negatively affected. After approximately 15 years of ignoring high court rulings, the government shut down more than 100 tanneries the weekend of 8 April 2017 in the neighborhood.

The higher cost associated with the treatment of effluents than to untreated effluent discharging leads to illegal dumping to save on costs. For instance, in Croatia in 2001, proper pollution abatement cost US$70–100 per ton of raw hides processed against $43/t for irresponsible behavior. In November 2009, one of Uganda's main leather making companies was caught directly dumping waste water into a wetland adjacent to Lake Victoria.

== Role of enzymes ==
Enzymes like proteases, lipases, and amylases have an important role in the soaking, dehairing, degreasing, and bating operations of leather manufacturing. Proteases are the most commonly used enzymes in leather production. The enzyme must not damage or dissolve collagen or keratin, but should hydrolyze casein, elastin, albumin, globulin-like proteins, and nonstructural proteins that are not essential for leather making. This process is called bating.

Lipases are used in the degreasing operation to hydrolyze fat particles embedded in the skin.

Amylases are used to soften skin, to bring out the grain, and to impart strength and flexibility to the skin. These enzymes are rarely used.

== Preservation and conditioning ==
The natural fibers of leather break down with the passage of time. Acidic leathers are particularly vulnerable to red rot, which causes powdering of the surface and a change in consistency. Damage from red rot is aggravated by high temperatures and relative humidities. Although it is chemically irreversible, treatments can add handling strength and prevent disintegration of red rotted leather.

Exposure to long periods of low relative humidities (below 40%) can cause leather to become desiccated, irreversibly changing the fibrous structure of the leather. Chemical damage can also occur from exposure to environmental factors, including ultraviolet light, ozone, acid from sulfurous and nitrous pollutants in the air, or through a chemical action following any treatment with tallow or oil compounds. Both oxidation and chemical damage occur faster at higher temperatures.

There are few methods to maintain and clean leather goods properly such as using damp cloth and avoid using a wet cloth or soaking the leather in water. Various treatments are available such as conditioners. Saddle soap is used for cleaning, conditioning, and softening leather. Leather shoes are widely conditioned with shoe polish.

== Modern leather attire ==
Due to its high resistance to abrasion and wind, leather found a use in rugged occupations. The enduring image of a cowboy in leather chaps gave way to the leather-jacketed and leather-helmeted aviator. When motorcycles were invented, some riders took to wearing heavy leather jackets to protect from road rash and wind blast; some also wear chaps or full leather pants to protect the lower body.

Leather's flexibility allows it to be formed and shaped into balls and protective gear. Subsequently, many sports use equipment made with leather, such as baseball gloves and the ball used in cricket and gridiron football.

Leather fetishism is the name popularly used to describe a fetishistic attraction to people wearing leather, or in certain cases, to the garments themselves.

Many rock groups (particularly heavy metal and punk groups in the 1970s and 80s) are well known for wearing leather clothing. Extreme metal bands (especially black metal bands) and Goth rock groups have extensive black leather clothing. Leather has become less common in the punk community over the last three decades, as there is opposition to the use of leather from punks who support animal rights.

Many cars and trucks come with optional or standard leather or "leather faced" seating.

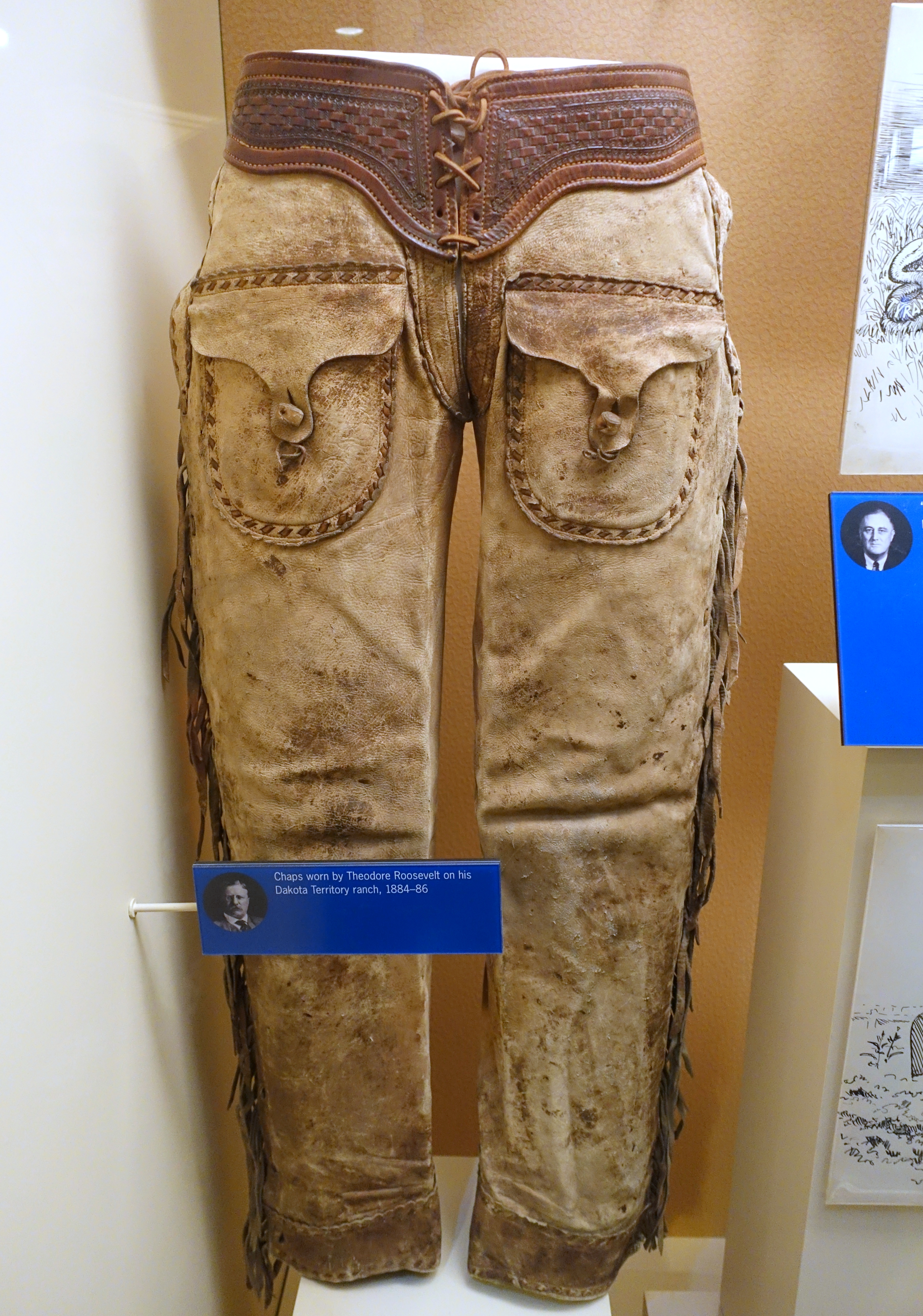
Chaps of Theodore Roosevelt

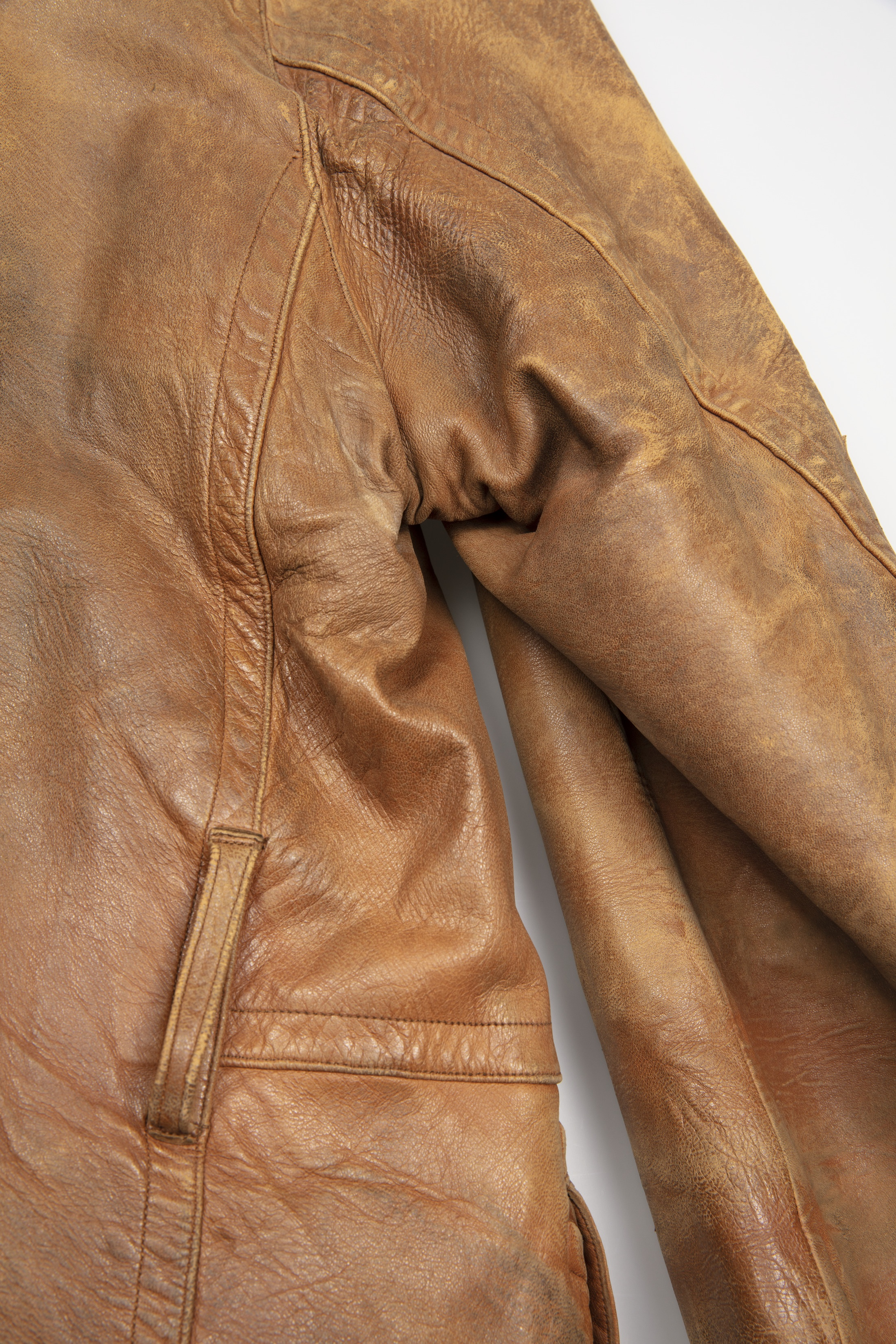
Flight jacket of Charles Lindbergh

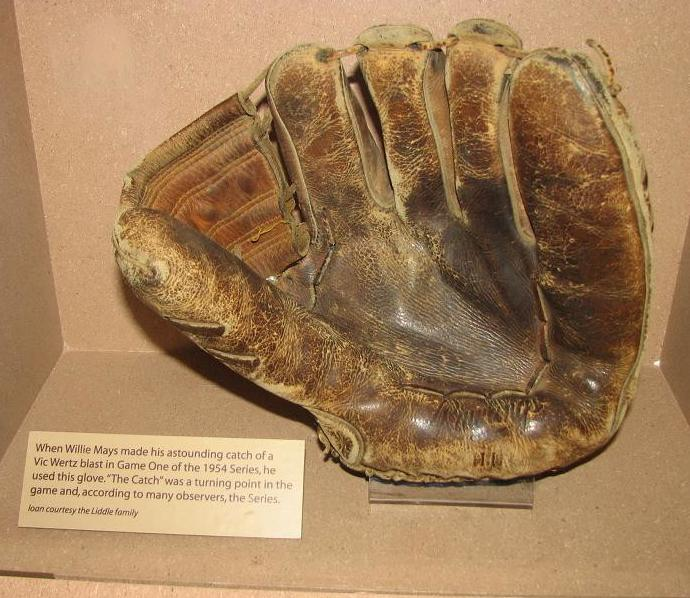
A baseball glove of Willie Mays

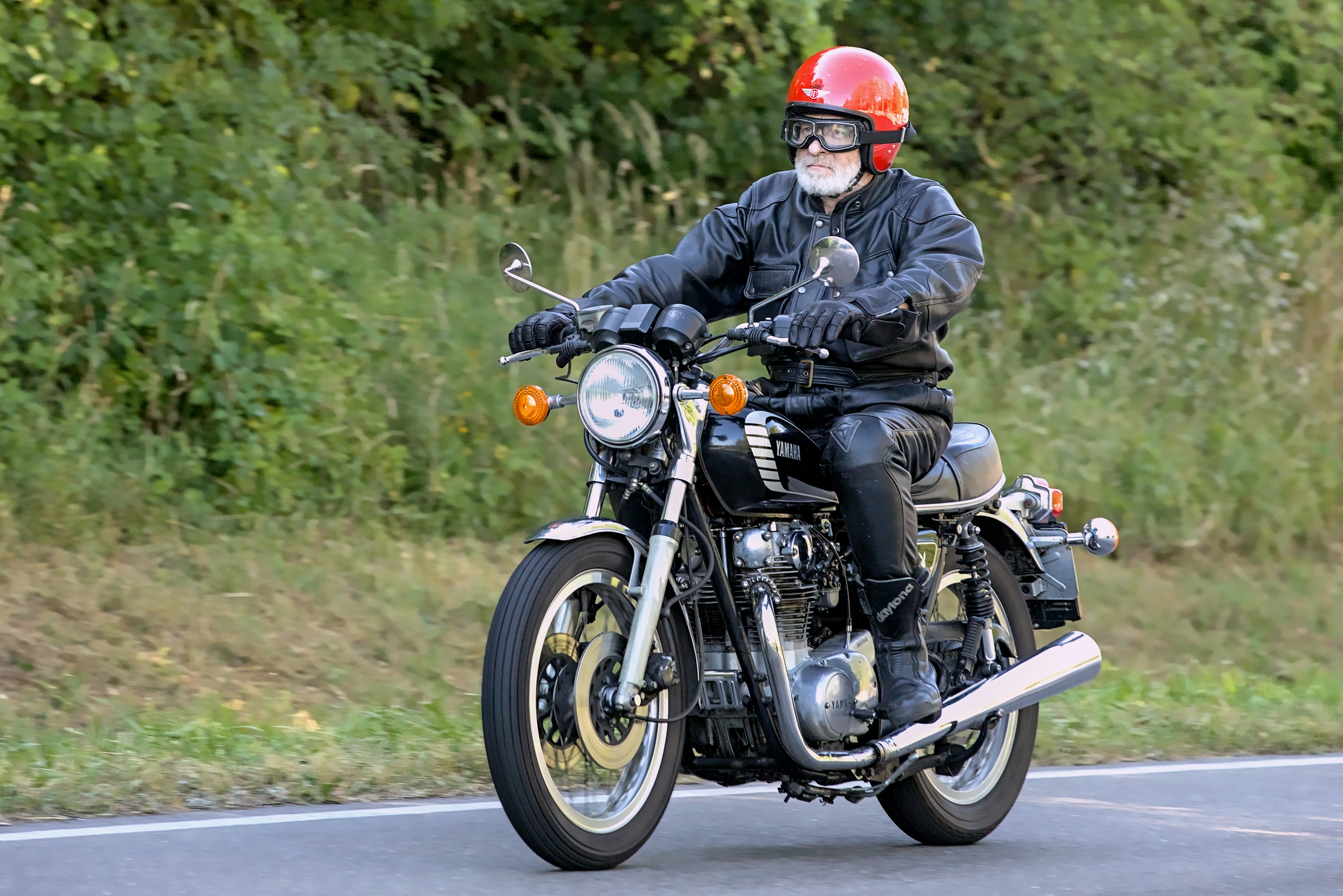
A biker in full-leather attire

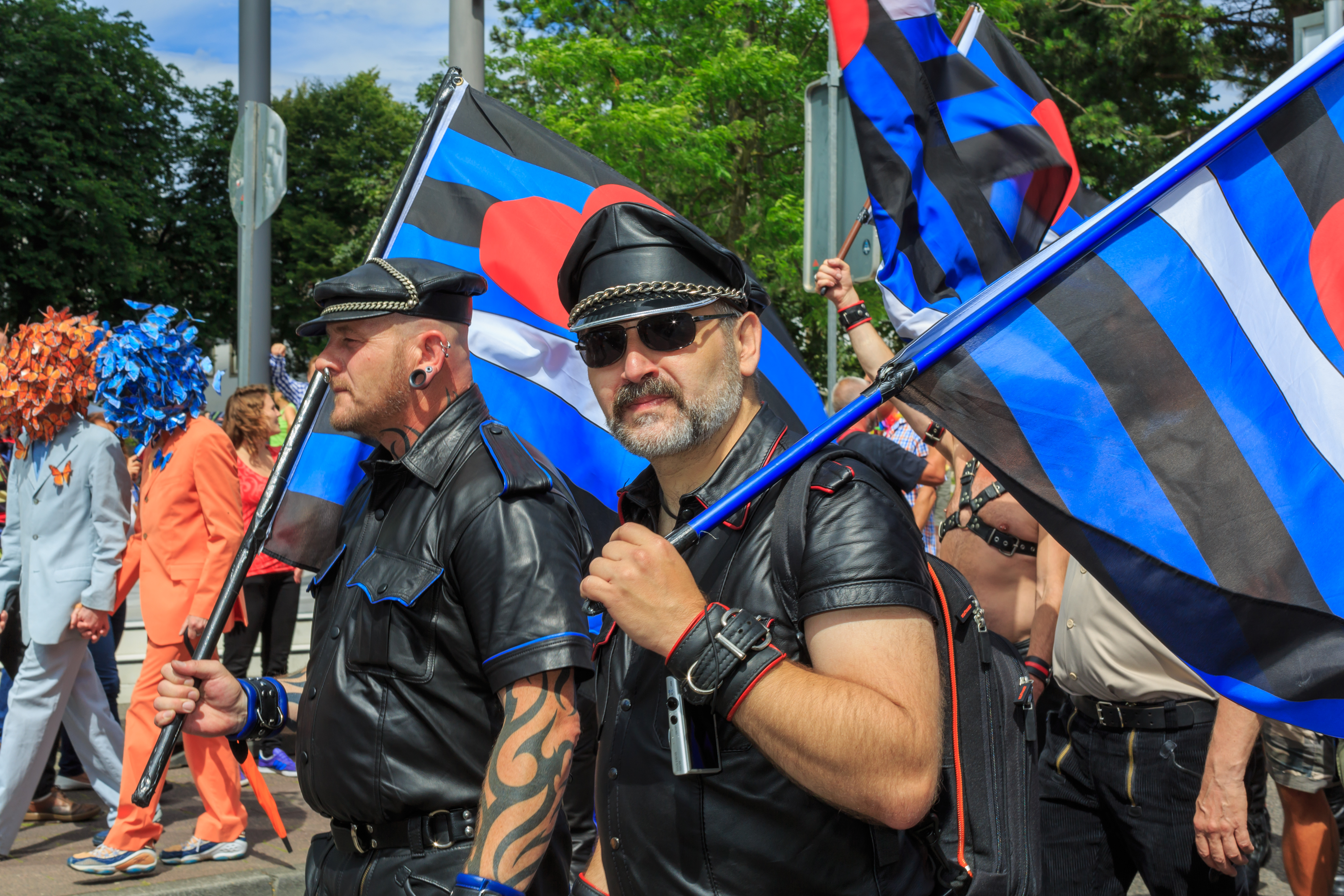
Leather gays at a parade

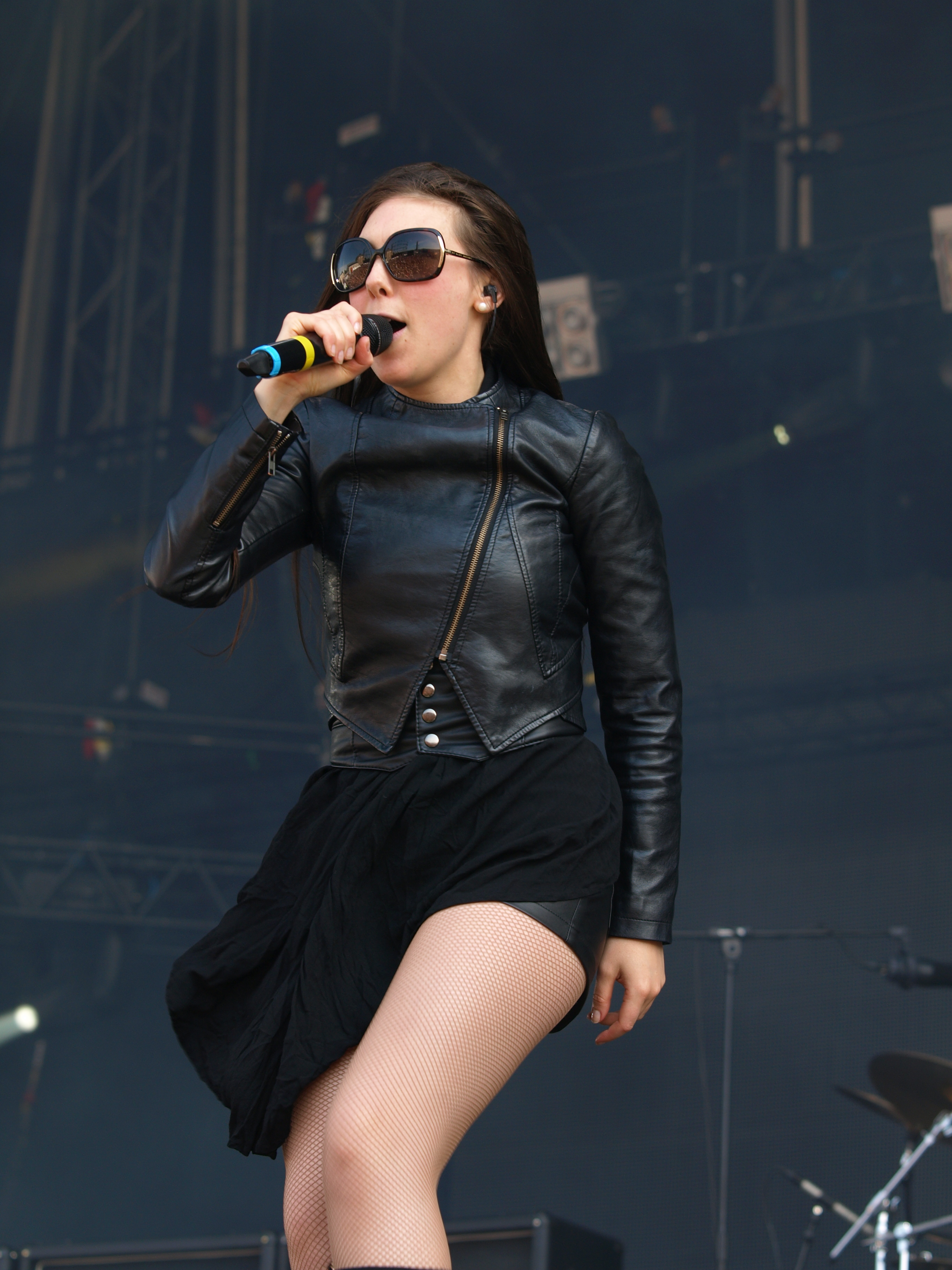
Heavy metal singer Elize Ryd in a leather jacket

== Religious sensitivities ==
In countries with significant populations of individuals observing religions which place restrictions on material choices, vendors typically clarify the source of leather in their products. Such labeling helps facilitate religious observance, so that, for example, a Muslim will not accidentally purchase pigskin or a Hindu can avoid cattleskin. Such taboos increase the demand for religiously neutral leathers such as ostrich and deer.

Jainism prohibits the use of leather, since it is obtained by killing animals, and Judaism forbids the comfort of wearing leather shoes on Yom Kippur, Tisha B'Av, and during mourning.

== Alternatives ==
Many forms of artificial leather have been developed, usually involving polyurethane or vinyl coatings applied to a cloth backing. Many names and brands for such artificial leathers exist, including "pleather", a portmanteau of "plastic leather", and the brand name Naugahyde.

Another alternative is cultured leather which is lab-grown using cell-culture methods, mushroom-based materials and gelatin-based textile made by upcycling meat industry waste. Leather made of fungi or mushroom-based materials are completely biodegradable.
