= Dubbing (music) =

Audio recording medium transfer

In sound recording, dubbing is the transfer or copying of previously recorded audio material from one medium to another of the same or a different type. It may be done with a machine designed for this purpose, or by connecting two different machines: one to play back and one to record the signal. The purpose of dubbing may be simply to make multiple copies of audio programs, or it may be done to preserve programs on old media which are deteriorating and may otherwise be lost.

One type of dubbing device combines two different storage media, such as an audio cassette deck that incorporates a Compact Disc recorder. Such a device enables the transfer of audio programs from an obsolete medium to a widely used medium. It may also simply be used to transfer material between two types of media which are popular in different settings, so that material originating in one type of environment can be used in another. An example of the latter would be the dubbing of a Digital BetaCam videocassette to DVD.

Another type of dubbing device is designed to rapidly produce many copies of a program. It may combine a single playback unit with multiple recording units to simultaneously create two, four, eight, sixteen, or more copies during the playback of a single original program. This type of device can often perform the copying process at many times the standard playback speed. Typical multiplexed dubbing decks of either analog (cassette) or digital (CD) programs can operate at 48 times the standard playback speed, thus producing complete copies of a program in sixty or ninety seconds. Sometimes this high-speed dubbing incurs some loss of quality compared to the best normal (1×) speed dub.

The verb "dub" as used here long predates and is unrelated to the Jamaican musical style dub music; the origin of both words stems from the dubplate. It is also different with the term dubbing, which is mostly a type of frottage dance usually found in the Caribbean clubs.

== Victor S/8 ==
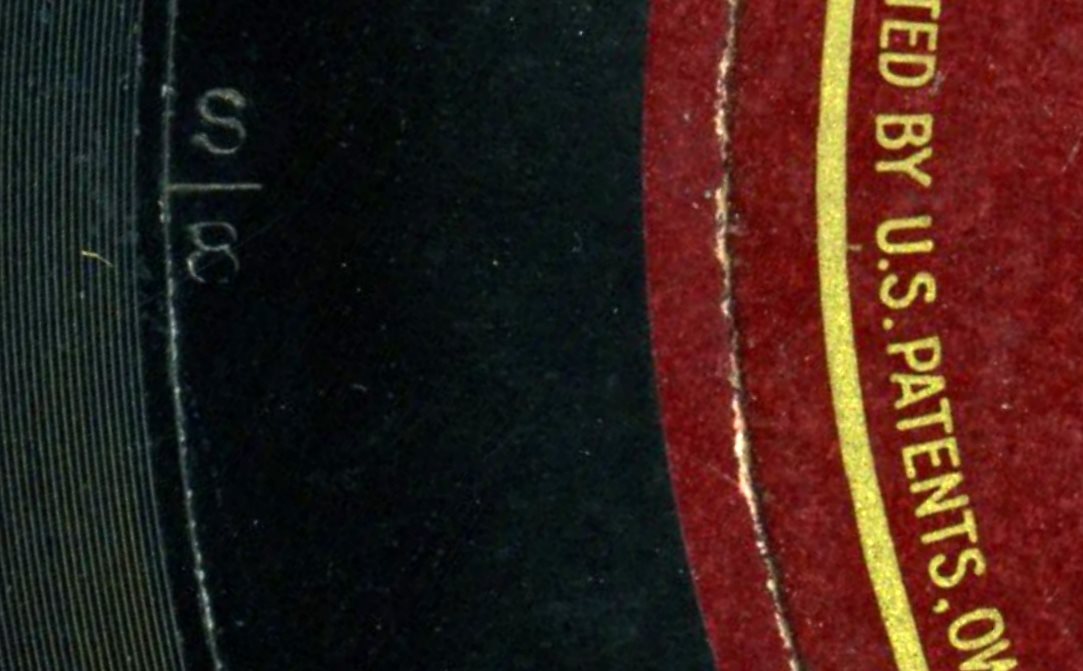
Victor S/8 marking

Some of the earliest dubbings were made by the Victor Talking Machine Co. In 1916, Victor developed an acoustical dubbing process to create new masters from pressings where damage had occurred to the originals. Such dubbings are marked with the symbol “s/8” stamped in the inner rim. These are occasionally (but not always) noted in the New York files. Pressings made from these dubbed masters are sonically inferior to the originals.

== See also ==
- Lip dub
- Overdubbing
- Dubbing
