= State =

State most commonly refers to:

- State (polity), a centralized political organization that regulates law and society within a territory
  - Sovereign state, a sovereign polity in international law, commonly referred to as a country
  - Nation state, a state where the majority identify with a single nation (with shared culture or ethnic group)
  - Constituent state, a political subdivision of a state
  - Federated state, constituent states part of a federation (examples below)
- State of nature, a concept within philosophy that describes the way humans acted before forming societies or civilizations

State may also refer to:

== Arts, entertainment, and media ==
=== Literature ===
- State Magazine, a monthly magazine published by the U.S. Department of State
- The State (newspaper), a daily newspaper in Columbia, South Carolina, US
- Our State, a monthly magazine published in North Carolina and formerly called The State
- The State (Larry Niven), a fictional future government in three novels by Larry Niven

=== Music ===
==== Groups and labels ====
- States Records, an American record label
- The State (band), Australian band previously known as the Cutters

==== Albums ====
- State (album), 2013, by Todd Rundgren
- States (album), 2013, by the Paper Kites
- States, 1991, by Klinik
- The State (album), 1999, by Nickelback

==== Songs ====
- "The State", 2011, by Porter Robinson from Spitfire

=== Television ===
- The State (American TV series), 1993
- The State (British TV series), 2017
- "State" (Friday Night Lights), an episode of the TV series Friday Night Lights

=== Other uses in arts, entertainment, and media ===
- State Theatre (disambiguation), several theatres
- The State (comedy troupe), an American comedy troupe

== Law and politics ==
=== Federated states ===
- States of Australia
- States of Austria
- States of Brazil
- States of Germany
- States of India
- States of Malaysia
- States of Mexico
- States of Micronesia
- States of Nigeria
- States of Somalia
- States of South Sudan
- States of Sudan
- States of the United States
- States of Venezuela

=== Constituent states ===
- States of Myanmar
- States of Palau

The Estates or the States, a national assembly of the estates of the realm, an early form of legislature common throughout feudal Europe:

- States of Alderney, the government and parliament of Alderney
- States of Deliberation, the government and parliament of Guernsey
- States of Jersey, including the States Assembly parliament and the Government of Jersey executive
- States-General (disambiguation), a name for several historic and current national assemblies

=== Other uses in law and politics ===
- Rechtsstaat, the legal state (constitutional state, state subordinated to law) in the philosophy of law and as a principle of many national constitutions
- United States Department of State, a division of the executive branch of the US federal government, dealing with foreign affairs; sometimes referred to as "State", for short, in American political jargon

== Locations ==
- State College, Pennsylvania, a city in the US, often referred to informally as "State"
  - State College Area High School, or "State High"
- State station, subway station in Boston
- State station (CTA), in Chicago

== Mathematics ==
- State (controls), a term related to control theory
- State (functional analysis), a positive linear functional on an operator algebra
- State, in dynamical systems, is a fixed rule describing the time dependence of a point in a geometrical space

== Science and technology ==
=== Computing ===
- State (computer science), a unique configuration of information in a program or machine
  - Program state, in computer science, a snapshot of the measure of various conditions in the system
- State (website), semantic web platform created by London, UK-based Equal Media Ltd.
- State pattern, in computer science, a behavioral design pattern

=== Healthcare ===
- Medical state, one's current state of health, usually within a hospital
- Mental state

=== Physics and chemistry ===
- State, a complete description of a system in classical mechanics
- Chemical state, the electronic, chemical and physical nature of an element
- Quantum state, the state of a quantum mechanical system given by a vector in the underlying Hilbert space
- Stationary state, an eigenvector of a Hamiltonian
- State of matter, solid, liquid or gaseous phases of matter; describing the organization of matter in a phase
- Thermodynamic state, a set of physical quantities describing variable properties of a given thermodynamic system

=== Printing ===
- State (printmaking), distinct revisions of a work by a deliberate change to the print master

== Universities ==
- Ball State University, in Muncie, US
- Georgia State University, in Atlanta, US
- Michigan State University, in East Lansing, US
- Michigan State Spartans, the athletic teams, commonly referred to as "State"

== Other uses ==
- State (theology), a degree or stage of perfection in the Christian religion
- States (automobile), cyclecar manufactured by the States Cyclecar Co of Detroit, Michigan in 1915

== See also ==
- Condition (disambiguation)
- Government, the system by which a state or community is controlled
- New states (disambiguation)
- Stateless (disambiguation)
- Statement (disambiguation)
- Status (disambiguation)
- The States (disambiguation)
