= Condition =

Condition or conditions may refer to:

== In philosophy and logic ==
- Human condition, characteristics and key events of human existence
- Material conditional, a logical connective used to form "if...then..." statements
- Necessary and sufficient condition, a statement which is true if and only if another given statement is true

== In science and technology ==
=== In computer science ===
- Exception handling#Condition systems, a generalization of exceptions in exception handling
- Condition (SQL), a filtering mechanism in relational database queries
- Condition variable, a synchronization primitive in concurrent programming

=== In medicine ===
- Medical condition, as a synonym for disease
- Medical state or condition, a patient's clinical status in a hospital

=== In numerical analysis ===
- Condition number, a measure of a matrix in digital computation

== In arts and entertainment ==
- Condition (film), a 2011 film
- Conditions (album), 2009 debut album by Australian rock band The Temper Trap
- Conditions (magazine), an annual lesbian feminist literary magazine
- Conditions (band), an American rock band
- "Just Dropped In (To See What Condition My Condition Was In)", a song written by Mickey Newbury and first released in 1967
- Status effect, a temporary condition of a character in computer gaming

== Other uses ==
- Conditions (Russia), part of the constitution of Russia, signed by Anna of Russia in 1730
- In contract law, part of covenants, conditions and restrictions
- Living condition
- State of being

== See also ==
- Conditional (disambiguation)
- Conditioner (disambiguation)
- Conditioning (disambiguation)
- State (disambiguation)
