= State Theatre (Benton Harbor, Michigan) =

- Interactive map of State Theatre
- Address: 148 West Main Street; Benton Harbor, Michigan; United States
- Coordinates: 42°6′55″N 86°27′26″W
- Owner: Benton Harbor Downtown Development Authority

Construction
- Opened: May 14, 1942; 84 years ago

The State Theatre is a movie theater in downtown Benton Harbor, Michigan. The State opened on May 14, 1942, operated by W. S. Butterfield Theatres. Butterfield sold the State in 1967, and it closed in 1974.

The State reopened as a community performing arts center in 1987, but closed again in 2007, and the building deteriorated substantially. As of 2023, the Benton Harbor Downtown Development Authority plans to renovate the theatre to its 1942 appearance and reopen it.

== History ==
W.S. Butterfield Theatres, founded by "Colonel" Walter Scott Butterfield, operated over 110 theaters in 1942. The Butterfield circuit operated theaters in much of Lower Michigan, as far north as Traverse City, with headquarters in Detroit.

In the Benton Harbor–St Joseph area, the Butterfield circuit operated four other theaters: the Lake, the Liberty, the Caldwell, and the Bell Opera House.

== Programming ==
The State has hosted a variety of programming in its over 80 years of history. The State opened in 1942 with the Gene Tierney film Sundown.

Following the State's closure as a cinema in 1974, it hosted a variety of programming. An after-school youth program used the building in the 1980s, a nonprofit operated it as a cinema, and it hosted multiple Habitat for Humanity events featuring former President Jimmy Carter.

== Future ==
The Benton Harbor Downtown Development Authority received an anonymous donation of $100,000 in 2022, earmarked for the restoration of the State Theatre. The Brickman family, owners of the State, donated the building to the DDA in September 2022. Restoration is estimated to cost over $1.5 million, and is projected to be completed in 2024.

The planned renovations will include the removal of a false front added in the 1960s, which will reveal the original glazed brick and glass block exterior. New seating will be installed, with a seating capacity of approximately 500.
