= Status message =

Instant messaging feature

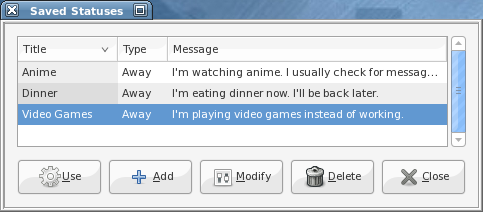
Status messages saved in Pidgin 2.0

A status message is a function of some instant messaging applications whereby a user may post a message that appears automatically to other users if they attempt to make contact. A status message can tell other contacts the user's current status, such as being busy or what the user is currently doing. It is analogous to the voice message in an answering machine or voice mail system. However, status messages may be displayed even if the person is present. They are often updated much more frequently than messages in answering machines, and thus may serve as a means of instant, limited "publication" or indirect communication. Generally, the available status is denoted by a green dot, while the busy status is denoted by a red dot on most of the instant messengers.

Whereas answering machine or voice mail messages often have a generic greeting to leave a message, status messages more often contain a description of where the person is at the moment or what they are doing. Because most instant messaging clients indicate to users when their online contacts are away before they send a message, more often than not away messages are meant to be read in lieu of sending a message, rather than a response. Away messages are not to be confused with idle messages, which is an automatic reply to a message when the messaging client has determined that the replier is not at their computer.

In the XMPP protocol for instant messaging, the status of a user is signalled by an element called presence. This provides a variety of functions, including the option to subscribe to the status so that the recipient is continuously updated with changes in status.

== See also ==
- Finger protocol
