= State Theater (Milwaukee) =

Former movie theater in Milwaukee, Wisconsin

Coordinates: 43°02′36.4″N 87°56′48.6″W

The State Theater was a 1,206-seat single-screen movie theater located at 2616 W. State Street in Milwaukee, Wisconsin. It opened in 1915 and by 1930 it was taken over by the Warner Bros. Circuit Management Corp. The cinema closed in 1957. Between 1976 and 1979 the building was renamed the Electric Ballroom and used as a live music venue, hosting acts such as AC/DC, Judas Priest, Budgie and The Runaways. The building was damaged by a fire in 2017.
