= Chemical conditioning =

Chemical process in which reaction factors are stabilized or enhanced

In chemistry, conditioning is a process in which chemical reaction factors are stabilized or enhanced. Examples include increasing the quality of a material by using another material (a conditioner) or improving the ability of solids to capture and physically or chemically treat water. There are three main conditioning systems: heat, inorganic compounds and organic polymers.
