= Mink oil =

Oil derived from the fat of mink

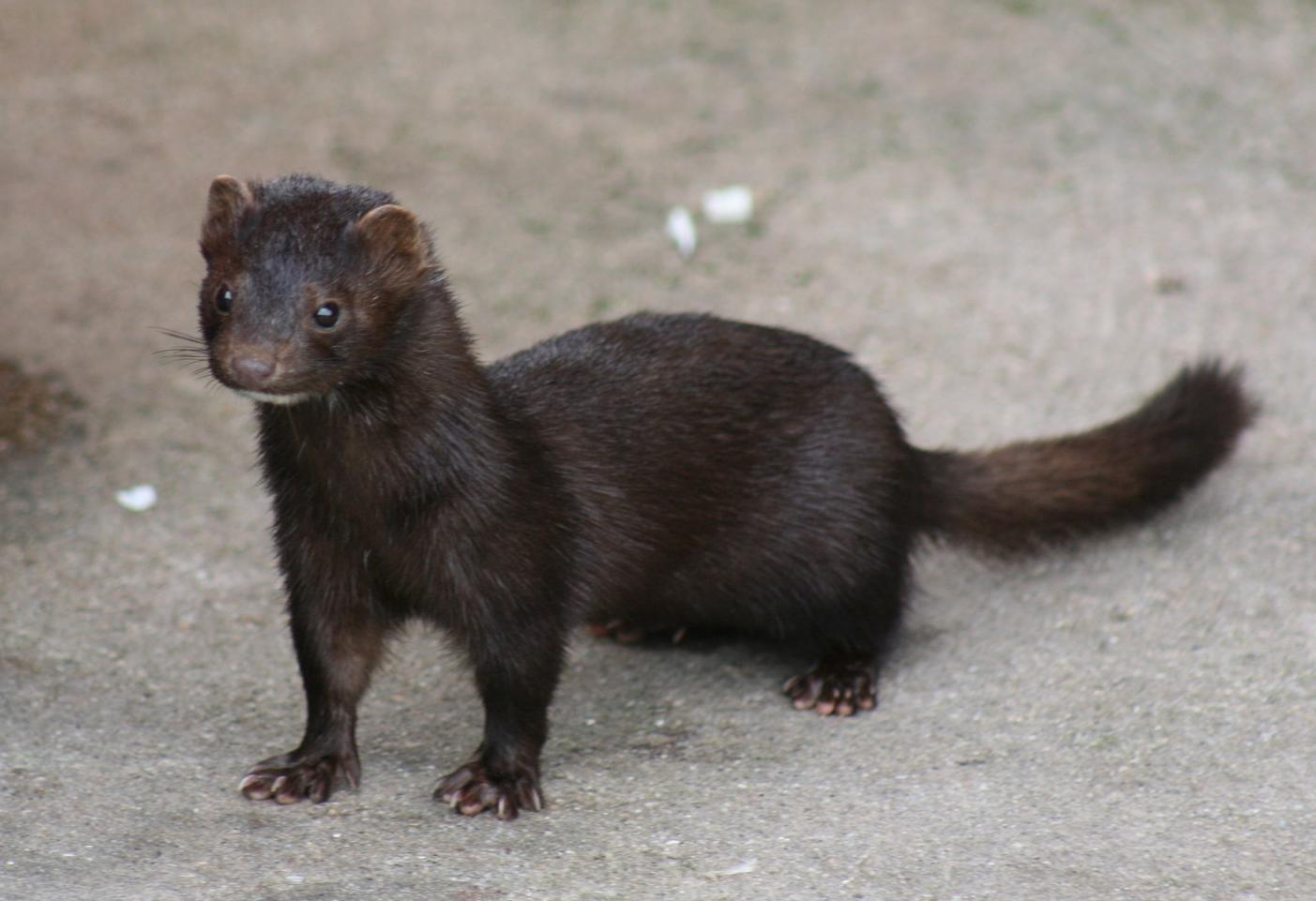
American mink (Neogale vison)

Mink oil is an oil used in medical and cosmetic products. Some of the cosmetic products that it is an ingredient in have to do with skin or hair products. It is obtained by the rendering of mink fat which has been removed from pelts bound for the fur industry. There are an abundant number of farms that farm the fur of these animals.

Skin tests have been done on rabbits to examine the effects of mink oil on scar tissue. More experiments were done on guinea pigs by injecting mink oil under the skin. There has also been a test conducted to examine the capabilities of mink oil surrounding the uses of sunscreen. There has not been any complete validation in the claims that mink oil is not safe for use in beauty items.

In spite of the term on products labeled “mink oil“, many commercial versions of so-named leather conditioner contain no natural mink oil.

== Characteristics ==
Mink oil is a source of palmitoleic acid, which possesses physical properties similar to human sebum. Because of this, mink oil is used in several medical and cosmetic products. Mink oil is also used for treating, conditioning and preserving nearly any type of leather.

Botanical alternatives to mink oil as a source of palmitoleic acid include macadamia oil (Macadamia integrifolia) and sea buckthorn oil (Hippophae rhamnoides), both of which contain as much or more palmitoleic acid (17% and 19–29% respectively) than does mink oil (17%).

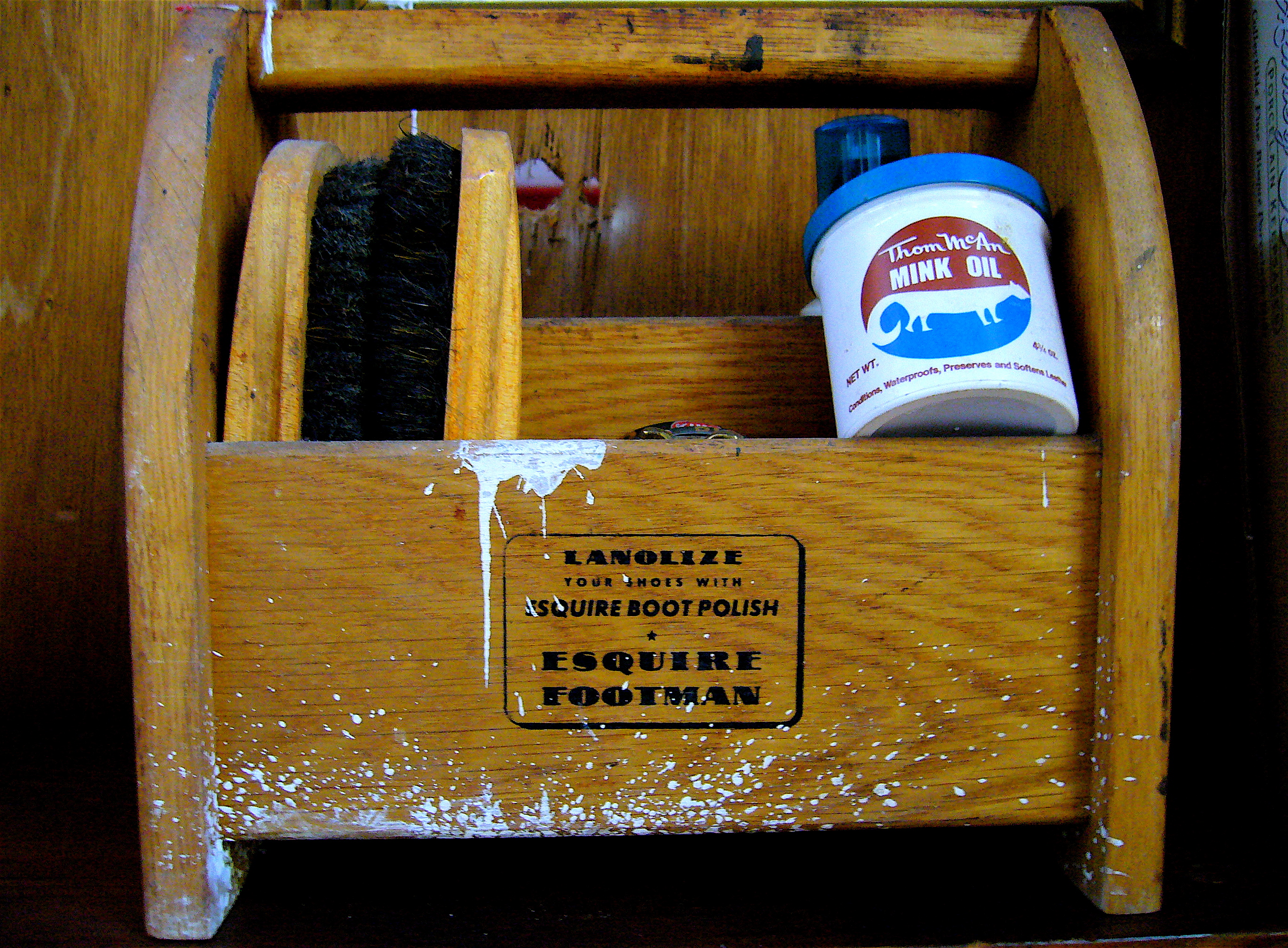
Shoeshine box with small jar of mink oil.

Mink oil and its fatty acids are unique among animal-derived fats and oils. The unsaturated fatty acids in mink oil account for more than 75% of its fatty acid content, but the oil, nevertheless, has a greater oxidative stability (resistance to rancidity) than other animal or vegetable oils.

== See also ==
- Neatsfoot oil, leather treatment
- Saddle soap, leather cleaning and conditioning
- Antipruritic, as the oil is often an ingredient in insect bite-reliever sticks
