= Dub (nickname) =

People nicknamed Dub or Dubs include:

- Dub Garrett (1925–1976), American football player
- Dub Jones (singer) (1928–2000), American bass R&B singer
- Dub Jones (American football) (born 1924), American former National Football League player
- Dub Robinson (c. 1920–1987), former tennis coach at Louisiana State University
- Dub Taylor (1907–1994), American actor
- Jamie Wilkinson, internet culture researcher and software engineer nicknamed "Dubs"
- Dub Williams (1927–2014), American politician

== See also ==
- Dub (disambiguation)
