= U-dub =

U-dub may refer to:

- University of Washington
- University of West Alabama
- University of Wisconsin–Whitewater
- University of Wyoming
