= Dubbin =

Wax product

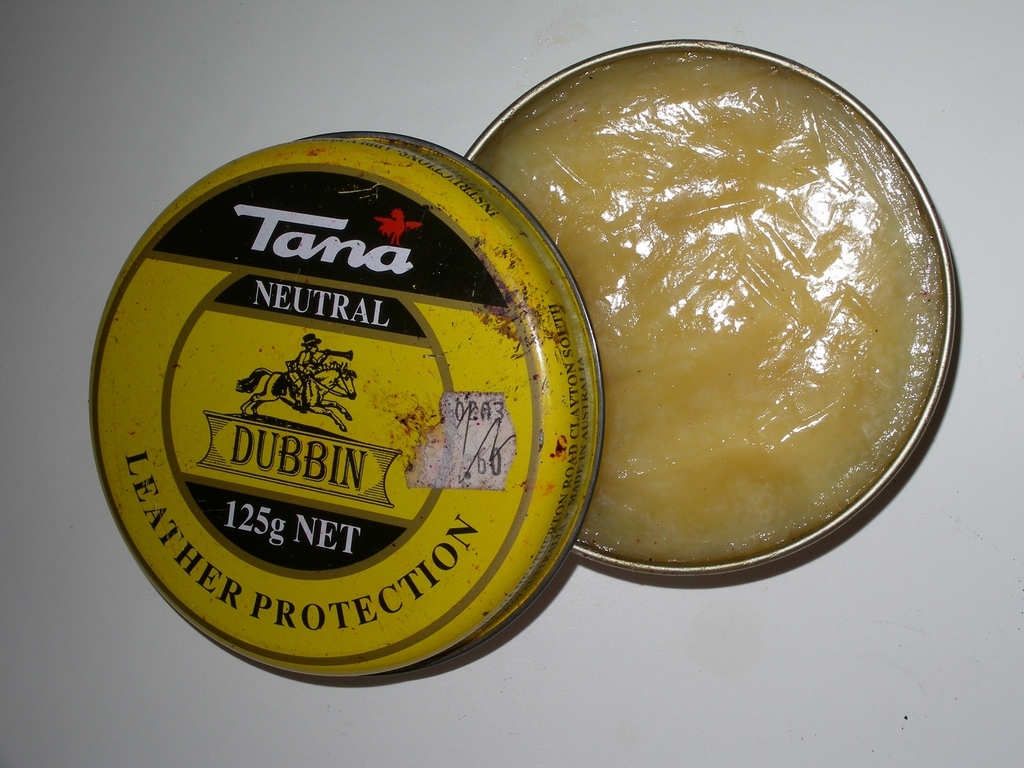
A tin of dubbin

Dubbin (also known as "dubbing" in the US) is a greasy or waxy product used to soften, condition, and waterproof leather. It has been used since medieval times to waterproof and soften leather goods. It differs from saddle soap used to clean and lightly condition leather, or shoe polish, which is used to impart shine and colour to it.

It consists primarily of various waxes and oils. Commercial dubbin contains petroleum jelly (petrolatum), paraffin wax, neatsfoot oil, and naphtha (C10-12 alkane/cycloalkane). More traditional dubbin can be made with beeswax, fish oil and lard.

The name dubbin is a contraction of the gerund dubbing, describing the action of applying the wax to leather.
