= Dub, Kotor =

Dub Дуб
- Village
- Location within Montenegro
- Coordinates: 42.386310°N 18.765569°E
- Country: Montenegro
- Region: Coastal
- Municipality: Kotor

Population (2011)
  - Total: 302
- Time zone: UTC+1 (CET)
  - Summer (DST): UTC+2 (CEST)

Dub (Montenegrin: Дуб) is a village in the municipality of Kotor, Montenegro.

== Demographics ==
According to the 2011 census, its population was 302.

Ethnicity in 2011
Ethnicity	Number	Percentage
Serbs	197	65.2%
Montenegrins	80	26.5%
Croats	6	2.0%
other/undeclared	19	6.3%
Total	302	100%
