= Dippel's oil =

Byproduct of bone destructive distillation

Dippel's oil (sometimes referred to as bone oil) is a nitrogenous by-product of the destructive distillation of bones and other parts of animal carcasses.

The oil is named after its inventor, Johann Konrad Dippel. It is derived by multiple distillations from raw animal oil ("oleum animale foetidum crudum"), a dark, viscous, tar-like liquid with an unpleasant smell, consisting of aliphatic chains, with nitrogen functional groups including pyrroles, pyridines and nitriles, as well as other nitrogenous compounds.

Oleum animale foetidum crudum had a number of uses, which are mostly obsolete. Its primary use was as an animal and insect repellent. It saw limited use as a chemical warfare harassing agent during the desert campaign of World War II. The oil was used to render wells undrinkable and thus deny their use to the enemy. By not being lethal, the oil was claimed to not be in breach of the Geneva Protocol.

== See also ==
- Neatsfoot oil, another bone-derived oil
- Bone char, what remains after the distillation of the bones
