= State Theatre (Hamilton, New Zealand) =

Coordinates: 37.7829°S 175.2794°E

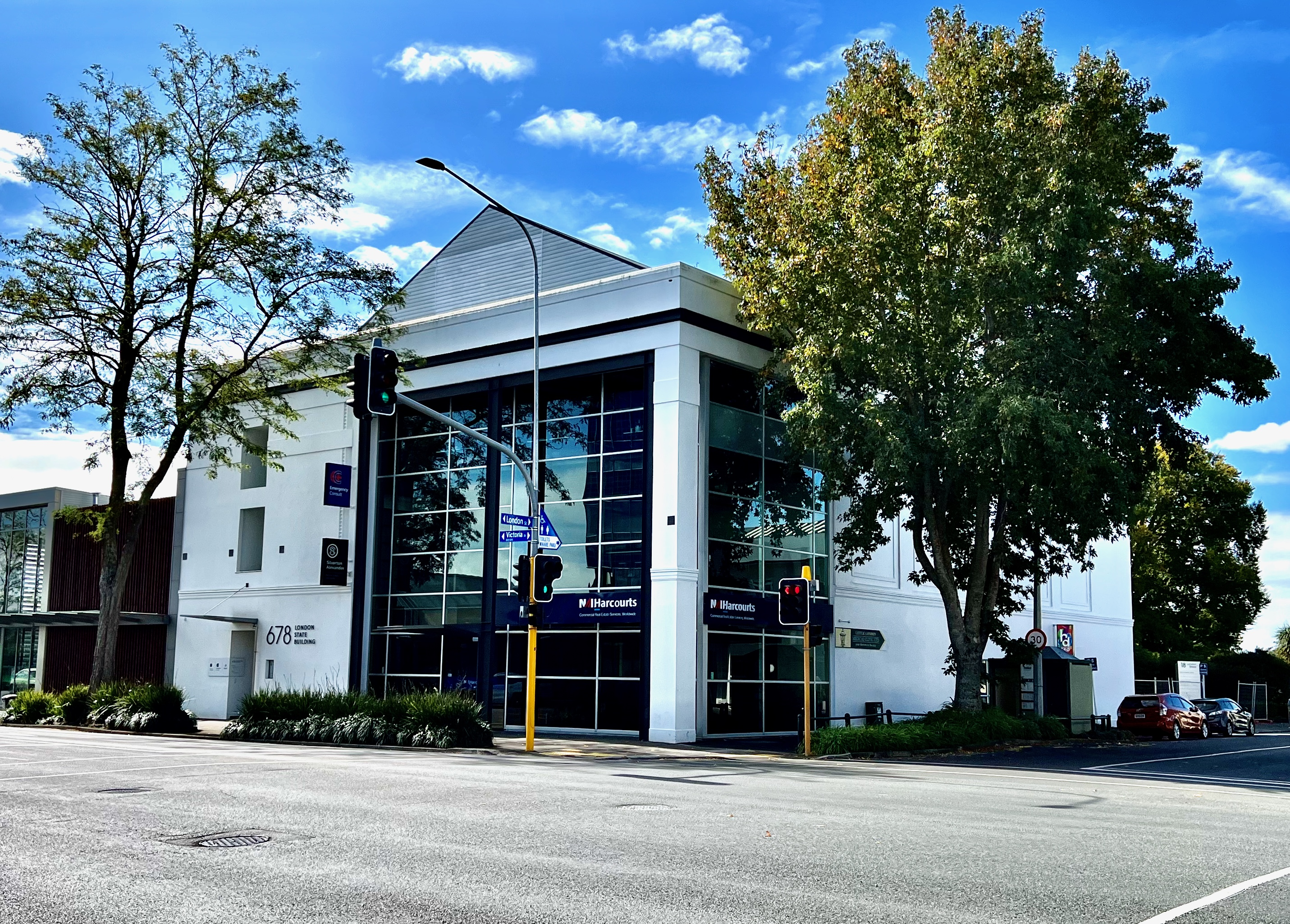
- London State Building, former Carlton, or State Theatre. Contrast with 1939 and 1980s photos
- Interactive map of the State Theatre area
- Former names: Carlton Theatre

General information
- Location: 678 Victoria Street, Hamilton, New Zealand

Technical details
- Floor count: 3

Design and construction
- Architect: Robert MacLaurin

The State Theatre, Hamilton, was one of 48 State cinemas opened by Amalgamated Theatres, Ltd in the 1930s, including in Christchurch, Timaru, New Plymouth, Dunedin, Hastings, Napier and Te Kuitl. The State Theatre in Hamilton, in brick and concrete, designed by Robert MacLaurin, built for about £14,000, by W. Goodfellow and opened on 1 June 1934, was on the corner of Victoria and London Streets. Films were projected using Western Electric Wide Range Sound. The movie theater remained in operation under that name until 1964 when, after a 10½-week renovation, it reopened as the Carlton Theatre and operated under that name until the early 1990s. After the Village Five cinemas opened in the Centre Place shopping mall in 1992, the State (along with many Hamilton theatres) closed. The building was used by the Fountain City Christian Church for several years thereafter.

The building was sold in 2001 to Bayleys Real Estate; while the building still stands, little remains of its original appearance. In late 2017 it was further modified and opened as London State Building, a three level 1,250 m^{2} (13,500 sq ft) commercial building, with 5 tenants and parking. The gable end and moulding on the Victoria Street façade and the blind arcading on the London Street frontage remain from the 1934 building.
