= Oliver Darcy =

American journalist (born 1990)

- Darcy at the 2026 Status Summit
- Born: August 20, 1990 (age 36)
- Education: University of California, Merced
- Employer: CNN (2017–2024)
- Website: status.news

Oliver Darcy (born August 20, 1990) is an American journalist, founder and lead author of the newsletter Status, and former senior media reporter at CNN.

== Early life ==
Darcy's parents migrated to the United States from Iran. He has stated that he developed an interest in journalism during high school. He became the editor-in-chief at The Charger, his high school newspaper. Darcy is a graduate of the University of California, Merced, with a degree in political science.

== Career ==
Darcy was the politics editor at Business Insider and deputy managing editor at The Blaze.

From 2017 to 2024, Darcy worked at CNN, beginning to write the network's Reliable Sources newsletter after Brian Stelter left the network in 2022. There, Darcy broke the news that a Tucker Carlson Tonight writer had a history of writing racist messages. He also was a frequent guest on CNN's cable news channel. Darcy announced in August 2024, after contract renewal negotiations, that he would pursue an independent newsletter about the media industry, with a source close to him saying Darcy declined to renew his contract with CNN.

=== Status ===
Paid subscriptions to Status cost $15 per month, or $150 per year. Within a month of launching Status, Darcy scooped a story about the relationship between journalist Olivia Nuzzi and former presidential candidate Robert F. Kennedy Jr., that Business Insider called "a staggering story" and which placed Nuzzi on leave from her job at New York magazine. In February 2025, Darcy brought former CNN editor Jon Passantino to Status. As of July 2025, Status had 85,000 total subscribers. Passantino and Darcy host a videocast entitled Power Lines based on their reporting, which began in July 2025.

In July 2026, Status announced its first live event, the Status Summit, a media-industry conference expanding the newsletter's brand into in-person programming.

== See also ==
- Puck (media company)
- Semafor (website)
