= Neatsfoot oil =

Cattle-based oil used as a treatment for leather

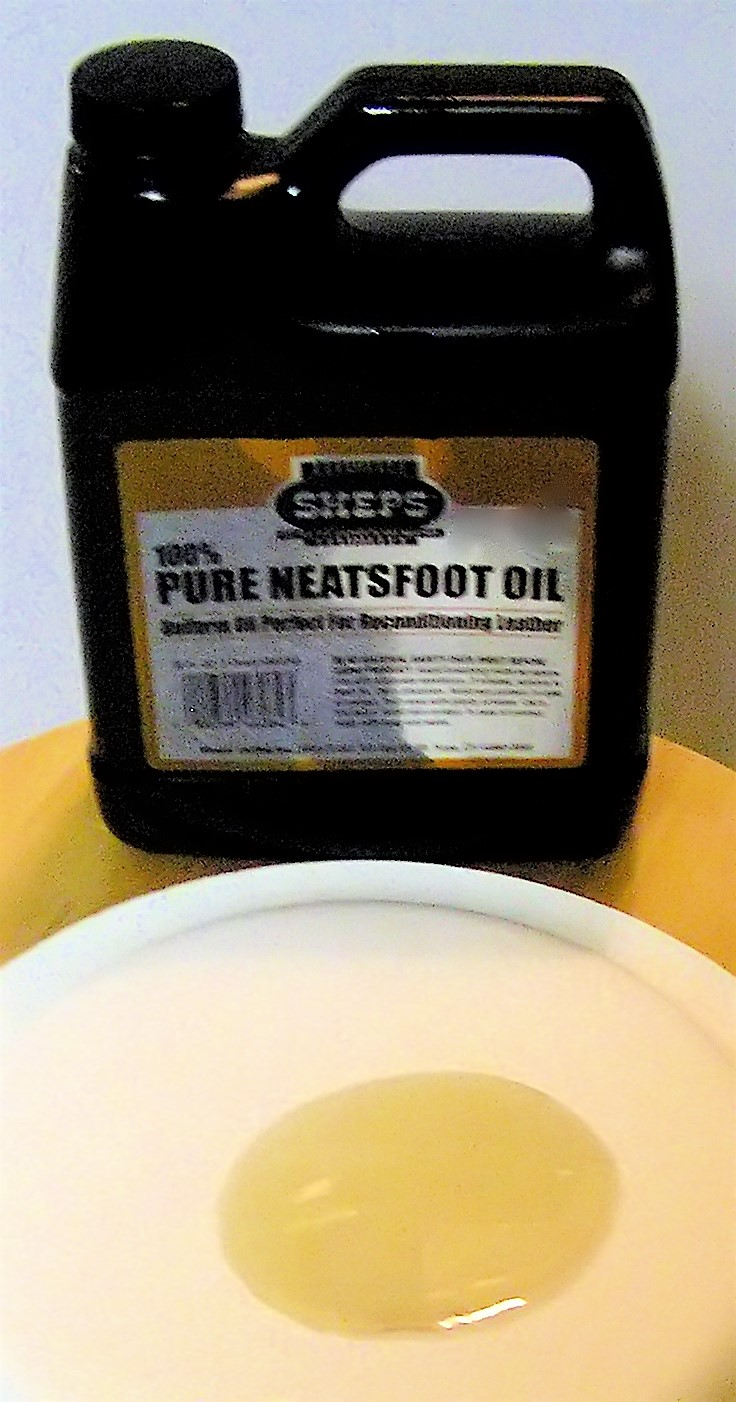
Neatsfoot oil

Neatsfoot oil is a yellow oil rendered and purified from the shin bones and feet (but not the hooves) of cattle. "Neat" in the oil's name comes from an Old English word for cattle. Neatsfoot oil is used as a conditioning, softening and preservative agent for leather. In the 18th century, it was also used medicinally as a topical application for dry scaly skin conditions.

Despite its name, "prime neatsfoot oil" (or "neatsfoot oil compound") is a blend of actual neatsfoot oil and non-animal oils, generally mineral or other petroleum-based oils.

== Characteristics ==
Fat from warm-blooded animals normally has a high melting point, becoming hard when cool, but neatsfoot oil remains liquid at room temperature. This is because the relatively slender legs and feet of animals such as cattle are adapted to tolerate and maintain much lower temperatures than that of the body core, using countercurrent heat exchange in the legs between warm arterial and cooler venous blood. Other body fat would become stiff at these temperatures. This characteristic of neatsfoot oil allows it to soak easily into leather.

Modern neatsfoot oil is still made from cattle-based products, and is sometimes criticized for a tendency to oxidize and therefore contribute to the deterioration of leather. This formulation does darken leather, particularly lighter shades. If mineral oil or other petroleum-based material is added, the product may be called "neatsfoot oil compound". Some brands have also been shown to be adulterated with rapeseed oil, soya oil, and other oils. The addition of mineral oils may lead to more rapid decay of non-synthetic stitching or speed breakdown of the leather itself.

== Manufacture ==
The lower legs of slaughtered cattle (less the hooves) are boiled, skin and all. The fat that is released (as an oil) is skimmed off, filtered, and pressed. The first pressing is the highest grade; the second produces both a lower grade and a solid press cake or stearin product used, among other things, to make soap.

== Uses ==
Neatsfoot oil is used to soften, condition, and preserve a number of leather products, including baseball gloves and horse tack, including saddles and harnesses. It is being displaced by synthetic products in certain applications.

Like other leather dressings, neatsfoot oil can oxidize with time and contribute to embrittling, especially on historical objects. It also may leave an oily residue that can attract dust.

Neatsfoot oil of the highest grade is used as a lubricant. It is used in metalworking industries as a cutting fluid for aluminium. For machining, tapping and drilling aluminium, it is superior to kerosene and various water-based cutting fluids.

Neatsfoot oil is often used to oil sign-writers' brushes that have been used in oil-based paint, as this oil is non drying and can be easily washed out with solvent at any time. Oiling the brushes reduces the buildup of pigment in the ferrule, the metal part that many brushes have to hold the hairs in place.

== See also ==
- Animal glue
- Dippel's oil, another oil, derived from bone
- Hoof glue
- Mink oil, alternative leather treatment
- Saddle soap, leather cleaning and conditioning
