= Conditioner (chemistry) =

Chemical substance or process which improves a material's quality

In chemistry and materials science, a conditioner is a substance or process that improves the quality of a given material. Conditioning agents used in skincare products are also known as moisturizers, and usually are composed of various oils and lubricants. One method of their use is as a coating of the substrate to alter the feel and appearance. For cosmetic products, this effect is a temporary one but can help to protect skin and hair from further damage.

In cosmetic products the types of conditioning agents used are as follows:

- Emollients, usually oils, fats, waxes or silicones, which are hydrophobic molecules of natural or synthetic origin that coat the skin or hair and provide an occlusive surface that helps prevent further loss of moisture as well as providing slip and lubricity
- Humectants, typically polyols or glycols, that can hydrogen bond with water in the skin and hair and reduce water loss
- Cationic surfactants or polymers that are substantive to the slightly negatively-charged skin and hair and provide a film on the hair that limits further damage
- Fatty alcohols which are amphiphilic and provide a hydrophobic coating to skin and hair as well as building a lamellar structure in the cosmetic product that builds viscosity as well as improving product stability

== See also ==
- Chemical conditioning
- Leather conditioner
