= The Tucker Carlson Show =

Weekly conservative political podcast

- Genre: Conservative commentary
- Format: Weekly long-form podcast
- Country of origin: United States
- Language: English

Cast and voices
- Hosted by: Tucker Carlson

Publication
- Original release: May 2024

The Tucker Carlson Show is a weekly conservative political podcast hosted by commentator Tucker Carlson. It is one of the most popular podcasts in the United States. The show, available as audio and video, was launched in May 2024 after Carlson was fired from his Fox News show Tucker Carlson Tonight in 2023.

The podcast has frequently courted controversy for its guests and content.

== History ==
Tucker Carlson Tonight on Fox News was the highest-rated cable news program at various points from 2021 to 2023. Tucker Carlson was fired from the show in April 2023 by the network's owner, Rupert Murdoch, after allegations were made over a toxic work environment on the show's set during the lawsuit Dominion Voting Systems v. Fox News Network. Weeks later, Carlson announced a live show on Twitter named Tucker on Twitter. In December 2023, Carlson launched the "Tucker Carlson Network" website, which hosts various conservative programs such as Tucker Carlson Uncensored and from other hosts.

The Tucker Carlson Show, a weekly podcast available as audio and video, started in May 2024. At its launch, Slate wrote that Carlson had diminished popularity and that he was readjusting his brand as a commentator to be more appealing to the alt-right rather than traditional conservatism. Tucker on Twitter, now named Tucker on X after Twitter changed its name to X, is still broadcast alongside The Tucker Carlson Show.

=== 2024 Darryl Cooper interview ===
The September 3, 2024, episode of The Tucker Carlson Show was an interview with amateur historian Darryl Cooper. Without correction or contradiction from Carlson, Cooper made comments that were seen as Holocaust denial, including saying that the millions of people who died during the Holocaust "ended up dead" as if by accident, rather than being systematically killed. Cooper said that Winston Churchill was the "real villain" of World War II, rather than Adolf Hitler. Hitler, he argued, "didn't kill the most people, he didn't commit the most atrocities", and the Nazi Party had expressed "humanity". Elon Musk, who owns X, tweeted that the podcast was "very interesting" and "worth watching"; he deleted the tweet later. The interview was condemned by Republican politicians Liz Cheney and Mike Lawler, the Anti-Defamation League, and White House senior deputy press secretary Andrew Bates. All 24 Democratic Jewish members of Congress issued a joint statement denouncing the interview.

JD Vance, then the Republican Party vice presidential candidate in the 2024 U.S. presidential election, was interviewed on The Tucker Carlson Show three days later. An official for Vance's campaign said that coming after Cooper was "not ideal timing, [but] it is what it is". When Vance was asked if Carlson should have interviewed Cooper, he replied, "Tucker Carlson isn't affiliated with the campaign. He's going to do what he wants to do".

=== 2025 Ted Cruz interview ===
On the June 18, 2025, episode of The Tucker Carlson Show, Carlson interviewed Republican U.S. Senator Ted Cruz, focusing on the prospect of U.S. involvement in the recently commenced war between Iran and Israel. Carlson and Cruz's conversation was largely seen as contentious, as they disagreed on a number of points—Carlson being against U.S.-backed regime change in Iran, and Cruz being in favor of it. A clip of Carlson asking Cruz the population of Iran (around 90 million) to gauge if he was knowledgeable about the subject, went viral on social media:

Carlson: Okay, so you topple the regime and by whatever means, what happens then? How many people live in Iran, by the way?

Cruz: I don't know the population at all. No, I don't know the population.

Carlson: You don't know the population of the country you seek to topple?

=== 2025 Nick Fuentes interview ===
On October 28, 2025, Carlson hosted white nationalist political commentator Nick Fuentes.

The Heritage Foundation publicly supported Carlson for having Fuentes onto his podcast; this ignited a debate about antisemitism among conservatives. Republicans including Ted Cruz and Mitch McConnell condemned the Heritage Foundation's defense of Carlson.

=== 2026 split with Trump ===
Following the start of U.S. military intervention against Iran, Carlson would criticize Trump on the show for his handling of the situation in Iran, dismissed concerns about Iranian weapons, and described the conflict as being based on the "lies" and "regional hegemony" desires of Israeli Prime Minister Benjamin Netanyahu, stating "This happened because Israel wanted it to happen. This is Israel's war. This is not the United States' war," "You have that country breaking apart, and what does that mean? Hard to see that as a good thing for the rest of the world," "The United States didn't make the decision here. Benjamin Netanyahu did," "The point is regional hegemony. Really simple," and "Israel wants to control the Middle East." This triggered backlash from Trump. In a phone interview with Rachael Blade of The Inner Circle on March 2, 2026, Trump declared that both Carlson and Megyn Kelly, another right wing commentator who criticized Trump's Iran policy, "aren't MAGA." On March 5, ABC News reporter Jonathan Karl revealed that Trump stated to him that "Tucker has lost his way," and "I knew that a long time ago, and he's not MAGA. MAGA is saving our country. MAGA is making our country great again. MAGA is America first, and Tucker is none of those things. And Tucker is really not smart enough to understand that." In response to Trump "throwing him out of MAGA," Carlson told Status' Oliver Darcy that "There are times I get annoyed with Trump, right now definitely included," while also claiming that "but I'll always love him no matter what he says about me."

On March 18, one day after resigning from the Trump Administration, former National Counterterrorism Center head Joe Kent would appear on The Tucker Carlson Show, insisting that Israel influenced U.S. participation in the Iran War. In addition, Kent alleged to Carlson that he learned that right wing American political activist Charlie Kirk had broken with Israel shortly before his murder.

== Reception ==
The Tucker Carlson Show is one of the most popular podcasts in the United States. In July 2024, it was ranked the most popular podcast on Spotify and the 11th most popular podcast on Apple Podcasts.

== See also ==
- The Tucker Carlson Interview
- Tucker (2005 TV program)
- Jon Stewart's 2004 appearance on Crossfire
- Dominion Voting Systems v. Fox News Network
