= Politicians, Partisans, and Parasites =

2003 political book by Tucker Carlson

Politicians, Partisans, and Parasites: My Adventures in Cable News
- First edition cover
- Author: Tucker Carlson
- Original title: Politicians, Partisans, and Parasites: My Adventures in Cable News
- Language: English
- Subject: American politics
- Genre: Memoir
- Published: September 15, 2003
- Publisher: Warner Books
- Publication place: United States
- Media type: Hardcover
- Pages: 208
- ISBN: 978-0-7595-0800-2
- Followed by: Ship of Fools (2018)

Politicians, Partisans, and Parasites: My Adventures in Cable News is a nonfiction book by journalist and political commentator Tucker Carlson, first published by Warner Books (now Grand Central Publishing). Carlson writes on his entry into cable news and his various opinions regarding several prominent politicians of the time, such as George W. Bush, Jesse Jackson, Ralph Nader, and John McCain, among others.

Regarding his transition from print journalism to television punditry, Carlson opines how fluid an environment it is in comparison to other trade professions, and how he stumbled into it easily and without much effort. Politicians, Partisans, and Parasites further expands on Carlson's time covering McCain's 2000 presidential bid, various odd encounters with some notable names, and his difficult relationship with a CNN producer Carlson simply dubs "Don".

Publishers Weekly found the book enjoyable in their review: "Anyone with a sense of humor will find this chronicle thoroughly enjoyable, and political junkies will likely laugh out loud more than once." The Washingtonian was complimentary of Carlson's humorous ponderances despite finding disagreement with his political views, "Carlson is a conservative talking head in a medium that favors badgering over deliberation, generalization over nuance. But I’m going to read the book again. And maybe again. Just, you know, to make sure I still hate it."

== Contents ==
At the beginning of Politicians, Partisans, and Parasites, Carlson opens with a quote Larry King had once remarked to him at the 2000 Democratic National Convention, "The trick is to care, but not too much. Give a shit — but not really." From there, Carlson recounts his stumbling into the business of television punditry, starting from his kneejerk acceptance of an invitation to go on 48 Hours to cover the O. J. Simpson murder case following a late vacancy, despite his acknowledgement of knowing "just about nothing" of it.

Carlson further expels several notable instances over the course of his career up to the point of writing the book, such as a rape accusation Carlson denies ever having committed from a woman in Indiana, Kimberly Carter, which later saw him being hooked up to a polygraph, and ultimately, the charges of which were dropped. Later, he receives an opportunity to comment on the 2000 vice presidential debates from the conservative side, with Bill Press representing the liberal perspective. It impresses the executives at CNN, which eventually lead to the birth of the short-lived The Spin Room. Carlson puts the blame for the show's quick demise on a specific producer at CNN, who goes by the pseudonym "Don" in the book. Carlson describes Don as someone who, "came off as both insecure and pompous, the sort of person who uses long words he doesn’t fully understand." Eventually, Carlson gets a slot on Crossfire, and recounts how his first interaction with James Carville, in what Carlson describes as "Carville’s Prison Chow Line Moment," forms a liking between the two.

Commenting on some of his early political beliefs, Carlson fondly remarks on John McCain during his time covering the 2000 Republican Party presidential primaries from his point of view. Though he expresses regret in his indulgence, in regards to his drinking of alcohol, and to the overly-friendly nature that begun to emerge among the press and McCain's campaign team, with Carlson writing, "I heard others, usually at night in the hotel bar, slip into the habit of referring to the McCain campaign as ‘we’ — as in, ‘I hope we kill Bush.’ It was wrong, but it was hard to resist."
