= Ship of Fools (Carlson book) =

Political book by Tucker Carlson

- First edition cover
- Author: Tucker Carlson
- Audio read by: Tucker Carlson
- Cover artist: Gary Locke
- Language: English
- Subject: American politics
- Genre: Creative nonfiction
- Publisher: Simon & Schuster
- Publication date: October 2, 2018
- Publication place: United States
- Pages: 244
- ISBN: 978-1-501-18366-9
- Preceded by: Politicians, Partisans, and Parasites (2003)
- Followed by: The Long Slide (2021)
- Website: Official website

Ship of Fools: How a Selfish Ruling Class Is Bringing America to the Brink of Revolution is a nonfiction political book by television host Tucker Carlson. Published by Simon & Schuster, Ship of Fools was released on October 2, 2018, before that year's midterm elections, and entered number one on The New York Times Best Seller list.

== Synopsis ==
Carlson's thesis applies the allegory given in Plato's Republic to the modern United States: the American Ship of State has been hijacked by an incompetent crew (the current political and economic elite ruling class) who are oblivious or contemptuous to the needs of the passengers (the citizens) and intolerant of criticism. Carlson does not restrict his definition of the elite to liberal members of Congress, but rather includes both Republican (Mitch McConnell, Lindsey Graham) and Democratic (Maxine Waters, Nancy Pelosi, and Hillary Clinton) politicians, neoconservative pundits such as Bill Kristol, and entrepreneurs such as Mark Zuckerberg and Jeff Bezos, whom he blames for decimating the American middle class. Quickly summarizing the premise of the book, Carlson has said it simply amounts to: "Why did Trump get elected?"

== Reception ==
The Washington Times praised the book, describing it as "bulging with big and interesting ideas, presented succinctly with wit and precision, each chapter a potential book in itself. In a sense, it reflects how and why Mr. Carlson's television show is so highly successful—quick intelligence, precision with words, the rat-a-tat style that today's television demands." President Donald Trump, who Carlson describes as "vulgar and ignorant" and "a throbbing middle finger in the face of America's ruling class" in the book, publicly congratulated Carlson for the book's success.

Marianna Raymond, Carlson's liberal first-grade teacher at La Jolla Country Day School, of whom Carlson writes loudly cried at her desk and about his wish for her to "stop blubbering and teach us to read," was interviewed by The Washington Post in 2021 about her inclusion in the book. Raymond, who said Carlson was "very precious and very, very polite and sweet" when she knew him, called her inclusion "the most embellished, crazy thing" she had ever heard. She claimed she never cried at her desk, never advocated her political views openly, and had been hired to tutor Carlson, where he claimed a separate tutor had to be hired.
