= Darryl Cooper =

American podcaster

- Born: United States
- Occupations: Podcaster, writer

Darryl Cooper is an American right-wing podcaster who has made Nazi apologist claims. In 2024, Cooper gained prominence after appearing on The Joe Rogan Experience and The Tucker Carlson Show.

Cooper has been the subject of controversy due to his commentary about Adolf Hitler, Nazi Germany, Winston Churchill, and World War II. Cooper’s interpretations of historical events have been criticized by historians for inaccuracies. He has also been accused of downplaying Nazi crimes and engaging in Holocaust denial.

== Political views ==
In 2021, Cooper gained significant attention for a viral Twitter thread attempting to explain why many supporters of U.S. president Donald Trump believed in claims of election fraud during the 2020 United States presidential election. This thread was highlighted by conservative commentator Tucker Carlson and mentioned by Trump himself.

In September 2024, Cooper appeared on The Tucker Carlson Show. He made statements that drew widespread criticism from historians, Holocaust memorial organizations, and political figures for promoting Holocaust denial. Cooper's comments, suggesting that the genocide was an unplanned consequence of wartime chaos, directly contradict the historical consensus that the Nazi regime pursued a racial war of extermination from the outset. In response to the interview, all 24 Jewish Democratic Party members of the U.S. House of Representatives issued a joint statement condemning Cooper as a "Nazi apologist" and warning that such rhetoric promotes Holocaust revisionism under the guise of historical reinterpretation.

In March 2025, Cooper was a guest on The Joe Rogan Experience podcast. During the interview, Cooper alleged that Hitler opposed the Kristallnacht pogrom. Cooper's comments on the Kristallnacht were reviewed and criticised by British historian Richard J. Evans. Cooper also said that Hitler, after viewing the "sorry state" of the German people, could only sympathize with the belief that they had been "manipulated" by the Jews, and that Hitler's "antisemitism is what allowed him to love the German people." Rogan commended Cooper's views, calling them comprehensive and nuanced.

Before gaining prominence through his Substack newsletter and podcast, Darryl Cooper reportedly responded positively to a comment on a white-nationalist forum discussing strategies for introducing nationalist ideas to mainstream audiences without alienating them. The comment, which emphasized gradual ideological shifts and subtle messaging, was highlighted in a Mother Jones article titled “How Nazi-obsessed amateur historian Darryl Cooper went from obscurity to the top of Substack.” Observers have noted that Cooper's subsequent work has employed similar techniques to present far-right ideas to a broader audience, contributing to scrutiny of his views and associations. In 2026, he recommended a World War II book by an author he described as “openly sympathetic to the Third Reich”.

Cooper has been very critical of Churchill, having described Churchill as the "chief villain of World War II". Cooper's statements about Churchill have been met with widespread criticism. In a now-deleted Twitter post, Cooper said that an infamous wartime photograph of Hitler arriving in Nazi-occupied Paris was "infinitely preferable in every way" to a picture from the Paris 2024 Summer Olympics opening ceremony featuring drag queens in a scene that he believed was inspired by The Last Supper. Cooper has also cited and defended the work of British Holocaust denier David Irving, stating that his works were censored because of "pressure groups".
