= The Long Slide =

Book about American politics

The Long Slide: Thirty Years in American Journalism
- First edition cover
- Author: Tucker Carlson
- Original title: The Long Slide: Thirty Years in American Journalism
- Cover artist: Gary Locke
- Language: English
- Subject: American politics
- Genre: Memoir
- Published: August 10, 2021
- Publisher: Simon & Schuster
- Publication place: United States
- Media type: Hardcover
- Pages: 288
- ISBN: 978-1-5011-8369-0
- Preceded by: Ship of Fools (2018)
- Website: Official website

The Long Slide: Thirty Years in American Journalism is a nonfiction book by political commentator Tucker Carlson. Published by Simon & Schuster, the book is a collection of Carlson's essays, spanning several decades. The publisher says The Long Slide "delivers a few of his favorite pieces—annotated with new commentary and insight—to memorialize the tolerance and diversity of thought that the media used to celebrate instead of punish."

The introduction to the book also discuses its own publisher's actions and the controversy surrounding their withdrawal from publishing Missouri Senator Josh Hawley's The Tyranny of Big Tech earlier in the year, and contrasting it with their publication of Hunter Biden's Beautiful Things.
