= Tucker Carlson =

American conservative political commentator (born 1969)

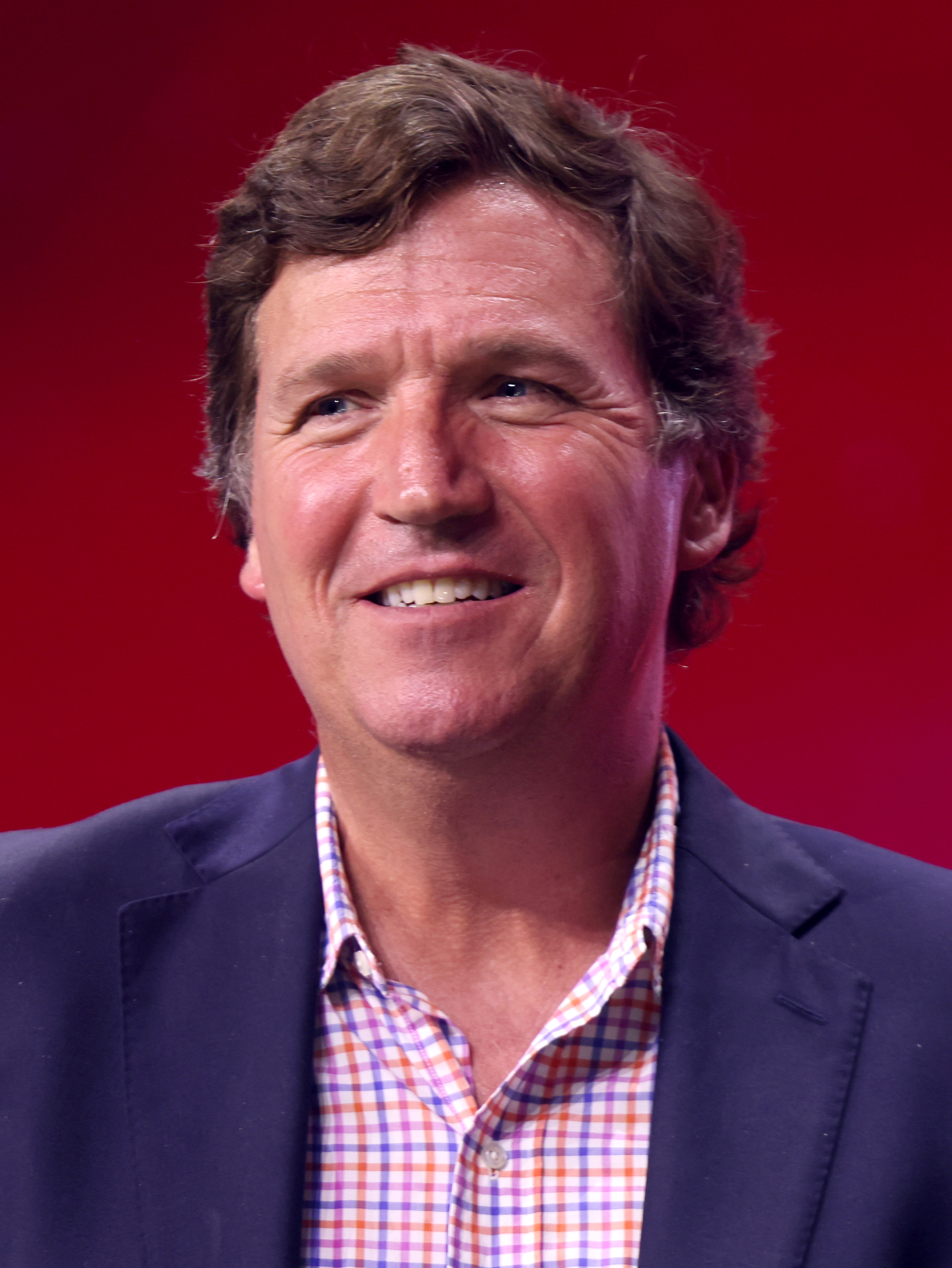
- Carlson in 2025
- Born: Tucker McNear Carlson; May 16, 1969 (age 57); San Francisco, California, U.S.
- Education: Trinity College (BA)
- Occupations: Television journalist; columnist; writer
- Employers: CNN (2000–2005); PBS (2004–2005); MSNBC (2005–2008); Fox News (2009–2023)
- Television: Crossfire; Tucker; Tucker Carlson Tonight
- Political party: Independent (2026–present); Republican (2020–2026); Democratic (Note: Carlson has stated that he was a registered Democratic voter only to be able to vote in Democratic primaries in Washington, D.C.) (2006–2020)
- Spouse: Susan Andrews (m. 1991)
- Children: 4
- Parents: Dick Carlson (father); Lisa McNear (mother)
- Tucker Carlson's voice On Jack Abramoff, 2011
- Website: tuckercarlson.com

Tucker Swanson McNear Carlson (born May 16, 1969) is an American conservative political commentator, journalist, and host of The Tucker Carlson Show since 2023. He previously hosted the nightly political talk show Tucker Carlson Tonight on Fox News from 2016 to 2023, the highest rated cable news show at the time of its termination. Carlson is considered to be an influential voice in right-wing media.

Carlson began his media career in the 1990s, writing for The Weekly Standard and other publications. He was a CNN commentator from 2000 to 2005 and a co-host of Crossfire, the network's prime-time news debate program, from 2001 to 2005. From 2005 to 2008, he hosted the nightly program Tucker on MSNBC. In 2009, he became a political analyst for Fox News, appearing on various programs before launching his own show. In 2010, Carlson co-founded and served as the initial editor-in-chief of The Daily Caller, a right-wing news and opinion website, until selling his ownership stake and leaving in 2020. In the 2021 Dominion Voting Systems v. Fox News Network defamation lawsuit, Carlson was among the hosts named for broadcasting false statements about the plaintiff company's voting machines. In April 2023, Fox News canceled Tucker Carlson Tonight, leading Carlson to launch his own program, The Tucker Carlson Show.

Originally a supporter of the Iraq War, he renounced his support in 2004 and has since been skeptical of U.S. foreign interventions. Formerly an economic libertarian, he now supports protectionism and restrictions on immigration. Carlson is known for introducing far-right ideas into mainstream politics and discourse. He has been noted for false and misleading statements on some topics and for promoting conspiracy theories on demographic replacement, COVID-19, the 2021 United States Capitol attack, and Ukrainian bioweapons. Some of Carlson's remarks on race, immigration, and women have been described as racist and sexist, and provoked advertiser boycotts of Tucker Carlson Tonight. A longtime supporter of U.S. president Donald Trump, he is said to have influenced Trump's decision-making, but has also been critical of Trump, most notably after the 2026 Iran war, causing him to leave the Republican Party. In February 2024 he became the first Western journalist to interview Russian President Vladimir Putin since the 2022 Russian invasion of Ukraine. He has written three books: Politicians, Partisans, and Parasites (2003), Ship of Fools (2018), and The Long Slide (2021).

== Early life and education ==
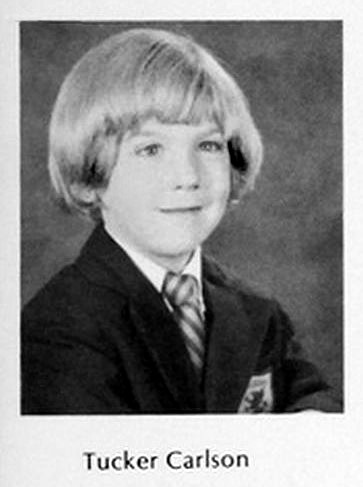
Carlson at La Jolla Country Day School in 1975

Tucker McNear Carlson was born at the Children's Hospital in San Francisco, California, on May 16, 1969. He is the elder son of Lisa McNear (née Lombardi; 1945–2011), an artist from San Francisco, and Dick Carlson (1941–2025), a former "gonzo reporter" who became the director of Voice of America, president of the Corporation for Public Broadcasting and the U.S. ambassador to the Seychelles, and more recently a director at the lobbying firm Policy Impact Strategic Communications. Carlson's brother, Buckley Peck Carlson, later Buckley Swanson Peck Carlson, is nearly two years younger and has worked as a communications manager and a Republican Party political operative.

Carlson's paternal grandparents were Richard Boynton and Dorothy Anderson, who were teenagers when they placed his father at The Home for Little Wanderers orphanage in Boston, where he was fostered by Carl Moberger of Malden, near Boston, a tannery worker of Swedish descent, and his wife Florence Moberger. Carlson's father was adopted at the age of two by upper-middle-class New Englanders, the Carlsons, an executive at the Winslow Brothers & Smith Tannery of Norwood (the oldest tannery in America) and his wife.

Carlson's mother descends from Henry Miller, the "Cattle King", and from the Swiss-Italian Cesar Lombardi, who immigrated to New York from Switzerland in 1860. However, Carlson himself is only 1/32 Italian-Swiss.

Carlson is also a distant relative of Massachusetts politicians Ebenezer R. Hoar and George M. Brooks. Carlson himself was named after his great-great-great-grandfather J. C. Tucker and his great-great-grandfather George W. McNear.

In 1976, Carlson's parents divorced after the nine-year marriage reportedly "turned sour". Carlson's father was granted custody of Tucker and his brother. Carlson's mother left the family when he was six and moved to France. The boys never saw her again.

When Carlson was in first grade, his father moved Tucker and his brother to the La Jolla neighborhood of San Diego, California, and raised them there. Carlson attended La Jolla Country Day School and grew up in a home overlooking the La Jolla Beach & Tennis Club. His father owned property in Nevada and Vermont, and islands in Maine and Nova Scotia. In 1984, his father unsuccessfully challenged the incumbent Republican Party mayor Roger Hedgecock in the San Diego mayoral race.

In 1979, Carlson's father married Patricia Caroline Swanson, an heiress to Swanson Enterprises (founded by Carl A. Swanson), daughter of Gilbert Carl Swanson and niece of Senator J. William Fulbright. Though Patricia remained a beneficiary of the family fortune, the Swansons had sold the brand to the Campbell Soup Company in 1955 and did not own it by the time of Carlson's father's marriage. This was the third marriage for Swanson, who legally adopted Tucker Carlson and his brother.

Carlson was briefly enrolled at Collège du Léman, a boarding school in the Canton of Geneva in French-speaking Switzerland, but said he was "kicked out". He attained his secondary education at St. George's School, a boarding school in Middletown, Rhode Island, where he started dating his future wife, Susan Andrews, the headmaster's daughter. He then attended Trinity College in Hartford, Connecticut. At the end of four years, he had achieved only a 1.9 Grade-Point Average (out of 4), and failed to graduate with his class. He graduated in absentia with the class of 1992. Carlson's Trinity yearbook describes him as a member of the "Dan White Society", an apparent reference to the American political assassin who murdered San Francisco mayor George Moscone and supervisor Harvey Milk. After college, Carlson tried to join the Central Intelligence Agency, but his application was denied, after which he decided to pursue a career in journalism with the encouragement of his father, who advised him that "they'll take anybody".

== Career ==
=== 1992–2006: Early career ===
Carlson began his career in journalism as a fact-checker for Policy Review, a conservative journal then published by the Heritage Foundation and later acquired by the Hoover Institution. He then worked as an opinion writer at the Arkansas Democrat-Gazette newspaper in Little Rock, Arkansas, before joining The Weekly Standard news magazine in 1995. Carlson sought a role with the publication after hearing of its founding, fearing he would be "written off as a wing nut" if he instead joined The American Spectator.

In 1999, Carlson interviewed then-Governor George W. Bush for Talk magazine. He quoted Bush mocking Karla Faye Tucker, who was executed in Bush's state of Texas, and frequently using the word "fuck". The piece led to bad publicity for Bush's 2000 presidential campaign. Bush claimed that "Mr. Carlson misread, mischaracterized me. He's a good reporter, he just misunderstood about how serious that was. I take the death penalty very seriously." Among liberals, Carlson's piece received praise, with Democratic consultant Bob Shrum calling it "vivid". Carlson said of the interview, "I thought I'd be ragged for writing a puffy piece. My wife said people are going to think you're hunting for a job in the Bush campaign."

Further into his career in print, Carlson worked as a columnist for New York magazine and Reader's Digest; writing for Esquire, Slate, The Weekly Standard, The New Republic, The New York Times Magazine, The Daily Beast, and The Wall Street Journal. John F. Harris of Politico would later remark on how Carlson was "viewed ... as an important voice of the intelligentsia" during this period. While working on a story for New York covering the Taliban, Carlson, alongside his father, was involved in a plane crash as it made its landing on a runway in Dubai on October 17, 2001. Carlson's 2003 Esquire profile on his journey to Liberia alongside Reverend Al Sharpton and other civil and political rights activists would garner a nomination at the National Magazine Awards.

In his early television career, Carlson wore bow ties, a habit from boarding school he continued on air until 2006.

On June 21, 2021, New York Times reporter Ben Smith reported that Carlson was a media source for several journalists and authors, including Michael Isikoff, Michael Wolff, Brian Stelter, and others who wrote critically of Donald Trump.

=== 2000–2005: CNN ===
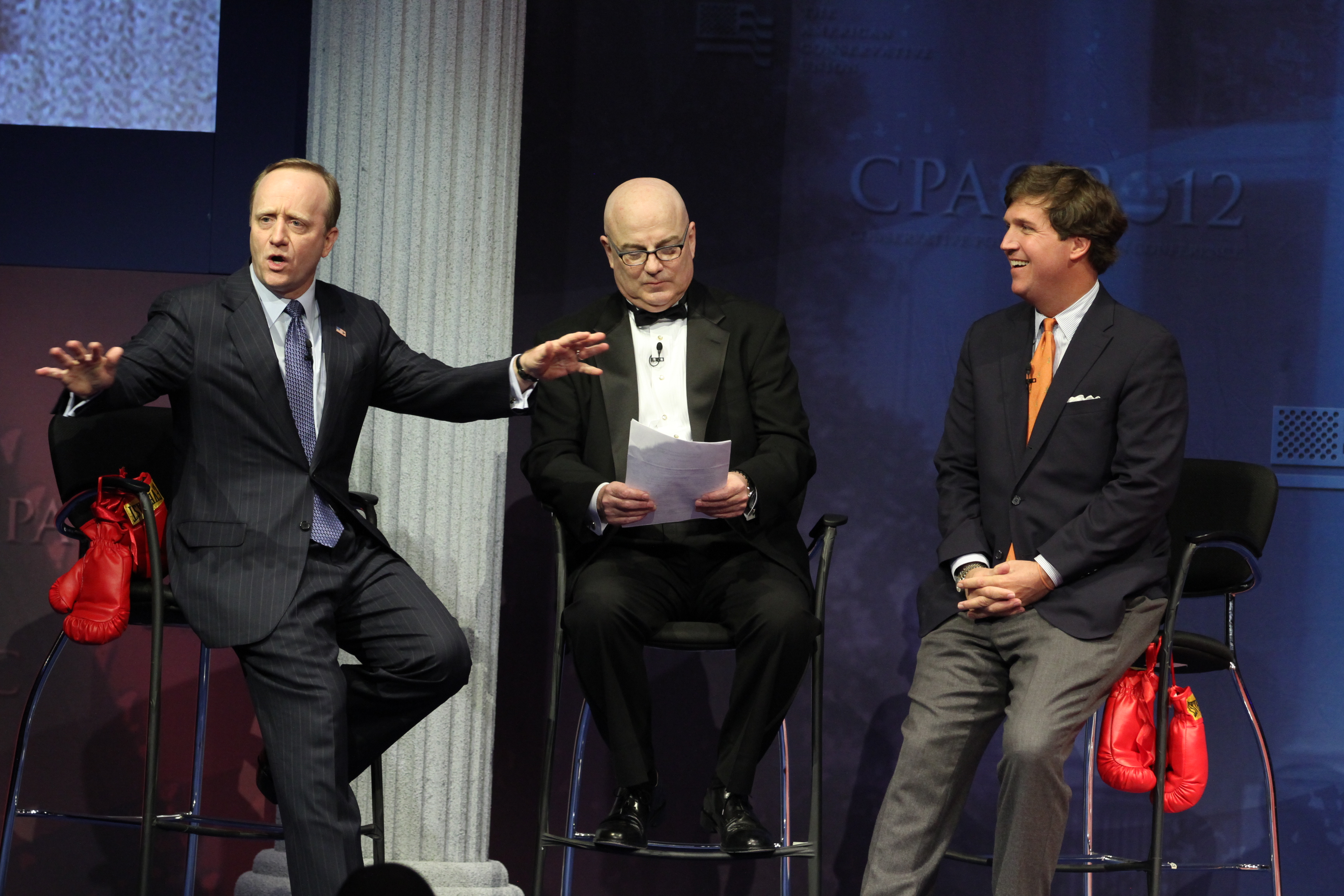
Paul Begala (left) and Tom McDevitt (center) with Carlson in 2012

In 2000, Carlson co-hosted the short-lived show The Spin Room on CNN. In 2001, he was appointed co-host of Crossfire, in which Carlson and Robert Novak represented the political right (alternating on different nights), while James Carville and Paul Begala, also alternating as hosts, represented the left.

Carlson's 2003 interview with Britney Spears, wherein he asked if she opposed the ongoing Iraq War and she responded, "[W]e should just trust our president in every decision he makes", was featured in the 2004 film Fahrenheit 9/11, for which she won a Golden Raspberry Award for Worst Supporting Actress at the 25th Golden Raspberry Awards.

==== Jon Stewart debate ====
In October 2004, comedian and The Daily Show host Jon Stewart appeared on Crossfire, ostensibly to promote America (The Book), but he instead launched into a critique of Crossfire, saying the show was harmful to political discourse in the U.S. Carlson was singled out by Stewart for criticism, with Carlson in turn criticizing Stewart for being biased toward the left. Carlson and Begala later recalled that Stewart and one of the book's co-authors, Ben Karlin, stayed at CNN for more than an hour after the show to discuss the issues he had raised on the air, with Carlson saying, "It was heartfelt. [Stewart] needed to do this." In 2017, The New York Times referred to Stewart's "on-air dressing-down" of Carlson as an "ignominious career [moment]" for Carlson, leading to the show's cancellation. The Atlantic suggested that Stewart's appearance was a turning point leading to how Carlson remade himself.

On January 5, 2005, CNN chief Jonathan Klein told Carlson the network had decided not to renew his contract. CNN announced that it was ending its relationship with Carlson and would soon cancel Crossfire. Carlson later said: "I resigned from Crossfire in April [2004], many months before Jon Stewart came on our show, because I didn't like the partisanship, and I thought in some ways it was kind of a pointless conversation."

=== 2004–2005: PBS ===
Carlson was hired to helm a new program for PBS in November 2003, Tucker Carlson: Unfiltered, which ran concurrently with Carlson's Crossfire gig on CNN. The show launched on June 18, 2004, and was, according to The New Yorker, "part of a broader effort to push PBS further to the right ideologically".

Carlson announced he was leaving the show roughly a year after it started on June 12, 2005, despite the Corporation for Public Broadcasting allocating money for another show season. Carlson wanted to focus on his new MSNBC show Tucker and said that although PBS was one of the "least bad" instances of government spending he disagreed with, it was still "problematic".

=== 2005–2008: MSNBC ===
Carlson's early evening show Tucker, originally titled The Situation with Tucker Carlson, premiered on June 13, 2005, on MSNBC. Rachel Maddow and Jay Severin featured as guests on a rotating panel. He also hosted a late-afternoon weekday wrap-up for the network during the 2006 Winter Olympics. He reported the aftermath of the Virginia Tech shooting and Johnson Space Center shooting in 2007.

Tucker was canceled by the network on March 10, 2008, owing to low ratings; the final episode aired on March 14, 2008. He remained with the network as a senior campaign correspondent for the 2008 election. Brian Stelter, writing for The New York Times, reported that "during Mr. Carlson's tenure, MSNBC's evening programming moved gradually to the left. His former time slots, 6:00 p.m. and 9:00 p.m., were subsequently occupied by two liberals, Ed Schultz and Rachel Maddow." Carlson said the network had changed a lot and "they didn't have a role for me".

=== 2006–2008: Media outside journalism ===
Carlson was a contestant on season 3 of the reality show Dancing with the Stars, which aired in 2006; he was paired with professional dancer Elena Grinenko. Carlson took four-hour-a-day ballroom dance classes to prepare. In an interview a month before the show began, he lamented that he would miss classes during a two-week-long MSNBC assignment in Lebanon, saying, "It's hard for me to remember the moves." Carlson said he accepted ABC's invitation to perform because "I don't do things that I'm not good at very often. I'm psyched to get to do that." Carlson was the first contestant eliminated, on September 13, 2006.

Carlson had cameo appearances as himself in the Season 1 episode "Hard Ball" of 30 Rock and in a Season 9 episode of The King of Queens. He had a cameo appearance in the 2008 film Swing Vote, again playing himself.

=== 2010–2020: The Daily Caller ===
On January 11, 2010, Carlson and Neil Patel (a former aide to Dick Cheney, and former college roommate of Carlson) launched a political news website titled The Daily Caller. Carlson served as editor-in-chief, and occasionally wrote opinion pieces with Patel. The website was funded by the conservative activist Foster Friess. By February 2010, The Daily Caller was part of the White House rotating press pool. Carlson reportedly offered his employees free junk food, an unmonitored keg, provided them with a ping pong table, and allowed them to sleep under their desks.

In interviews, Carlson said The Daily Caller would not be tied to ideology but rather "breaking stories of importance", and "We're not enforcing any kind of ideological orthodoxy on anyone." Columnist Mickey Kaus quit after Carlson refused to run a column critical of Fox News's coverage of the immigration policy debate due to his contractual obligations to Fox News.

In June 2010, The Daily Caller published excerpts from e-mails sent between members of JournoList, an invitation-only liberal forum, consisting of "several hundred journalists, academics and policy experts" launched in 2007 by Ezra Klein. The forum barred media reporters and conservatives. Carlson had earlier attempted to join the forum on May 25, 2010, but was denied by Klein. Klein offered to form a bipartisan forum with Carlson, but Carlson declined. Daily Caller employees later impersonated an editor of the Arkansas Times to gain entry into JournoList. The e-mails leaked by The Daily Caller, which detailed efforts to, according to Carlson, "formulate the most effective talking points in order to defeat Palin and McCain and help elect Barack Obama president", also contained statements by The Washington Post's Dave Weigel "wishing for the death of Rush Limbaugh" among other controversial remarks that The Washington Post considered "untenable", leading to his resignation.

In February 2012, The Daily Caller published an "investigative series" of articles co-authored by Carlson, purporting to be an insiders' exposé of Media Matters for America, the liberal watchdog group that monitors and scrutinizes conservative media outlets, and its founder David Brock. Reuters media critic and libertarian Jack Shafer, while commenting "I've never thought much of Media Matters' style of watchdogging or Brock's journalism", nevertheless sharply criticized The Daily Caller piece for relying on conjecture, absence of evidence, and inclusion of "anonymously sourced crap", adding that "Daily Caller is attacking Media Matters with bad journalism and lame propaganda."

In June 2017, the Center for Media and Democracy, a liberal watchdog organization, said The Daily Caller was paid $150,000 by Donald Trump's 2016 presidential campaign for its list of subscribers, whom the Trump campaign then emailed at least 25 times. The watchdog said Carlson had a conflict of interest and had violated journalistic standards.

In June 2020, Carlson sold his one-third stake in The Daily Caller to Patel for an undisclosed amount and said "Neil [Patel] runs it. I wasn't adding anything. So we made it official".

=== 2009–2023: Fox News Channel ===
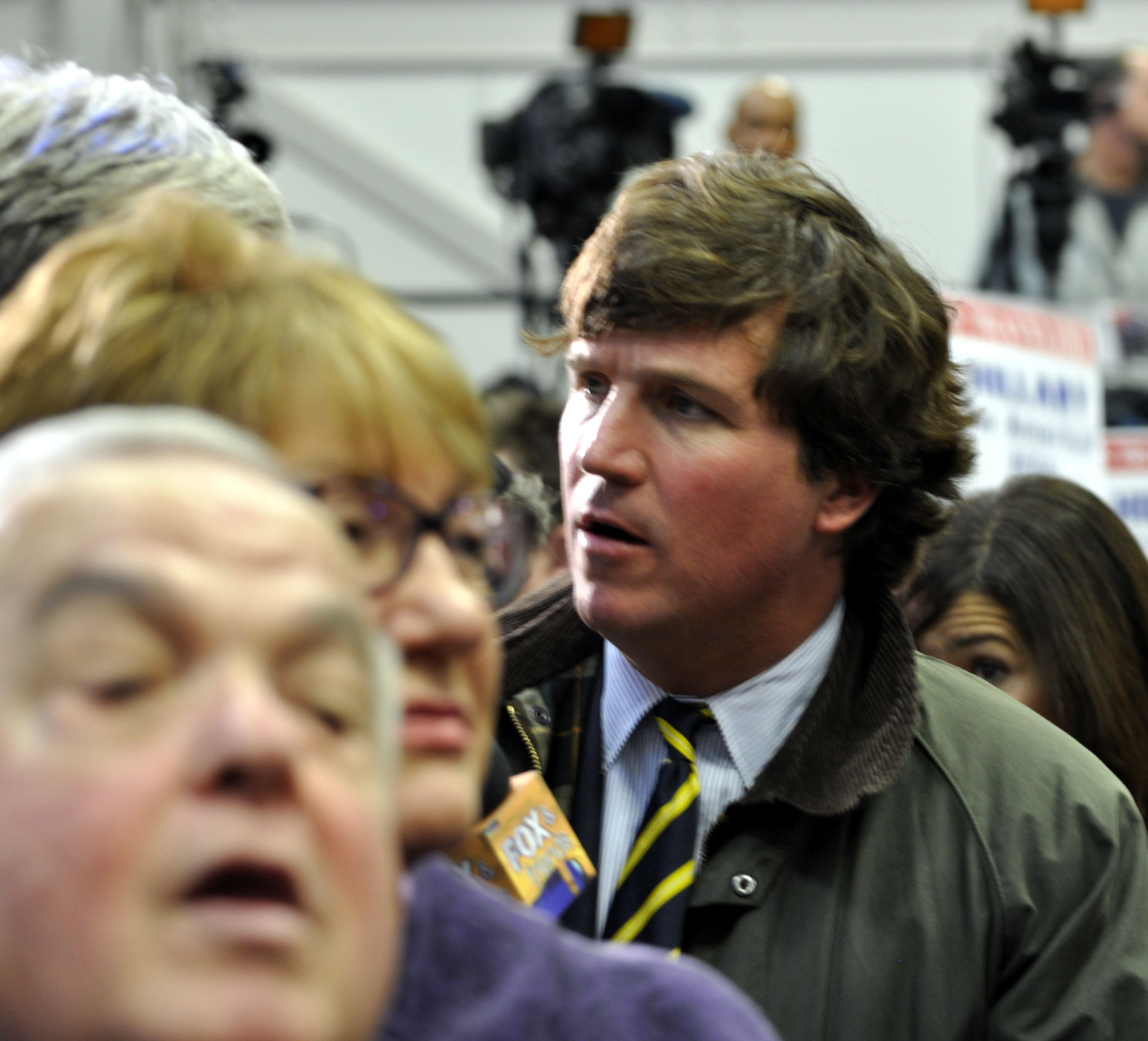
Carlson working as a Fox News correspondent at a Hillary Clinton campaign rally at Manchester Community College in 2016

In May 2009, Fox News announced that Carlson was being hired as a Fox News contributor. He was a frequent guest panelist on Fox's late-night satire show Red Eye w/Greg Gutfeld, made frequent appearances on the All-Star Panel segment of Special Report with Bret Baier, was a substitute host of Hannity in Sean Hannity's absence, and produced and hosted a special entitled Fighting for Our Children's Minds in September 2010.

On the eve of then-President Barack Obama's first debate with Mitt Romney in October 2012, Carlson publicized a 2007 video recording of then-Senator Obama criticizing the federal government's response to Hurricane Katrina and complimenting his pastor at the time, Reverend Jeremiah Wright. Wright's sermons had been a controversy in Obama's 2008 presidential campaign. Portions of the video had been available online since 2007. An anonymous user going by the name "Sore Throwt" (a pun on famous Watergate informant Deep Throat) had been looking for a buyer of the tape for a week before Carlson distributed it.

In April 2013, Carlson replaced Dave Briggs as a co-host of Fox & Friends Weekend, joining Alisyn Camerota and Clayton Morris on Saturday and Sunday mornings.

==== Tucker Carlson Tonight ====
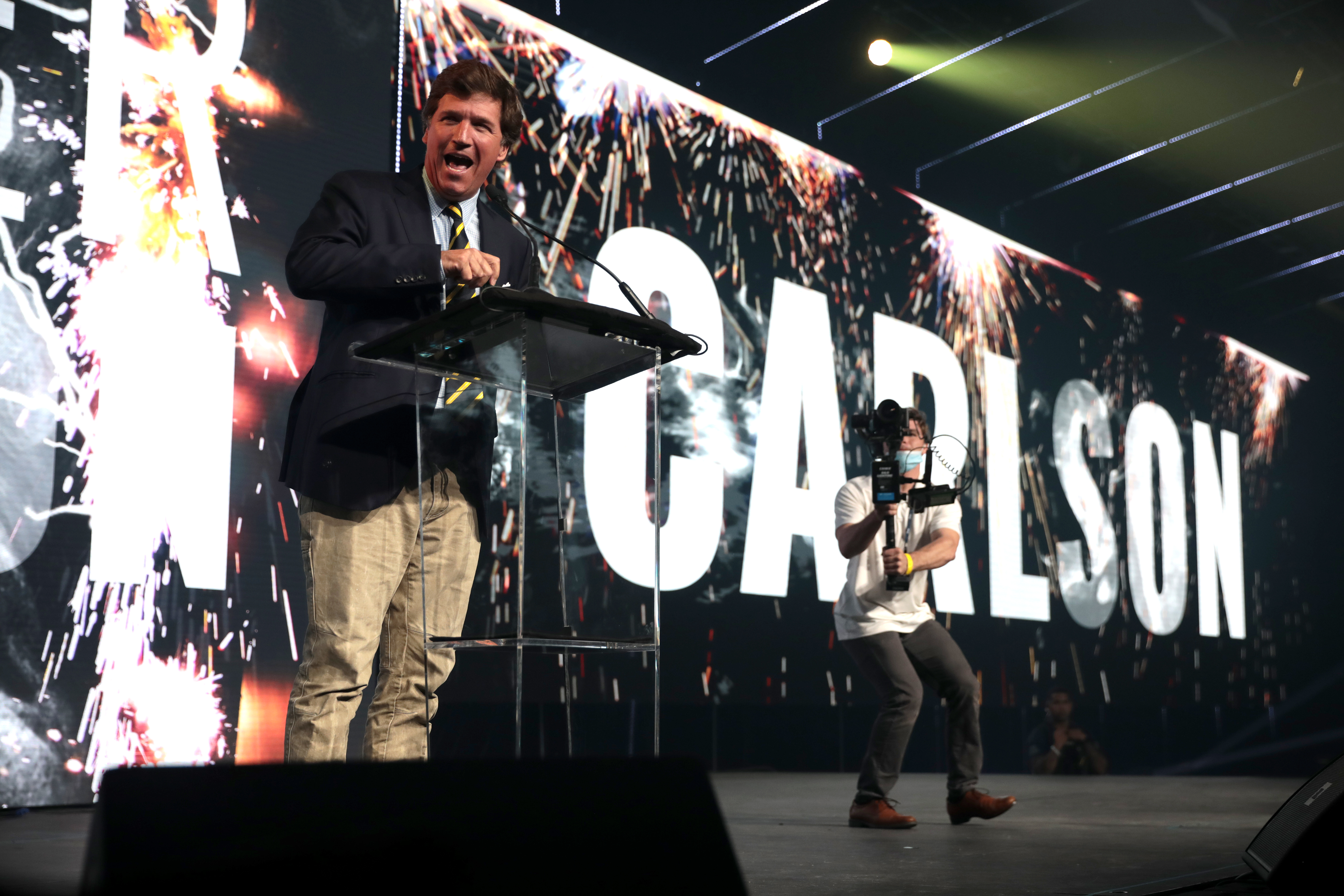
Carlson at the Student Action summit in West Palm Beach, Florida in 2020

On November 14, 2016, Carlson began hosting Tucker Carlson Tonight on Fox News. The premiere episode of the show, which replaced On the Record, was the network's most watched telecast of the year in the time slot, with 3.7 million viewers.

Tucker Carlson Tonight aired at 7:00 p.m. each weeknight until January 9, 2017, when Carlson's show replaced Megyn Kelly at the 9:00 p.m. time slot after she left Fox News. In January 2017, Forbes reported that the show had "scored consistently high ratings, averaging 2.8 million viewers per night and ranking as the number two cable news program behind The O'Reilly Factor in December". In March 2017, Tucker Carlson Tonight was the most watched cable program in the 9:00 p.m. time slot.

On April 19, 2017, following the cancellation of The O'Reilly Factor, Fox News announced that Tucker Carlson Tonight would air at 8:00 p.m. Tucker Carlson Tonight was the third-highest-rated cable news show as of March 2018.

In October 2018, Tucker Carlson Tonight was the second-highest rated cable news show in prime time, after The Sean Hannity Show with Sean Hannity, with 3.2 million nightly viewers. By the end of 2018, the show had begun to be boycotted by at least 20 advertisers after Carlson said immigration makes the country "poorer, dirtier and more divided". According to Fox News, the advertisers only moved their ad buys to other programs.

In November 2018, a "Smash Racism D.C.", a local anti-fascist group, protested outside Carlson's home in Washington, D.C. Carlson's driveway was vandalized with a spray-painted anarchist symbol. Carlson alleged "someone started throwing himself against the front door and actually cracked the front door," though police observed no damage to the door, nor did Washington Post columnist Erik Wemple when he visited the Carlson home the next day. Carlson was not home at the time of the incident.

By January 2019, Carlson's show dropped to third with 2.8 million nightly viewers, down six percent from the previous year. The show also lost at least 26 advertisers.

In March 2019, there were calls to fire Carlson from Fox News after Media Matters resurfaced remarks he had made over several years to the radio show Bubba the Love Sponge concerning women, calling them "like dogs" and "extremely primitive", and statutory rape, Iraqis, and immigrants. His ratings rose eight percent that week despite the boycotts.

By August 2019, Media Matters calculated that some companies had fulfilled their media buy contracts and advertising inventory for the time slot and had now begun their purchases for other time slots on Fox News. At the close of 2019, Carlson's Nielsen ratings among all viewers 25–54 placed him second only to Fox's The Sean Hannity Show among cable news shows.

In December 2019, Playboy model Karen McDougal sued Fox News after Carlson, in a 2018 episode of his show, accused her of extorting Donald Trump. In September 2020, federal judge Mary Kay Vyskocil dismissed the lawsuit, citing Fox News' defense that Carlson's extortion claims were opinion based and not "statements of fact". The judge also agreed with Fox News' defense that reasonable viewers would have "skepticism" over statements Carlson makes on its show, as he often engages in "exaggeration" and "non-literal commentary", and that Carlson is not "stating actual facts" on its show.

Beginning the week of June 8–14, 2020, Tucker Carlson Tonight became the highest-rated cable news show in the U.S., with an average of four million viewers, beating out the shows hosted by fellow Fox News pundits Hannity and Laura Ingraham. This came in the wake of Carlson's remarks criticizing the Black Lives Matter movement, which had caused some companies to pull their advertising from the show, including The Walt Disney Company, T-Mobile, and Papa John's.

In July 2020, Carlson's head writer Blake Neff resigned after CNN Business reported that he had been using a pseudonym to post remarks that were widely described as racist, sexist, and homophobic on AutoAdmit, a message board known for its lack of moderation of offensive and defamatory content. The incident drew renewed scrutiny to Carlson's program, already under pressure from sponsors because of Carlson's remarks about Black Lives Matter. Neff had also previously been a writer on The Daily Caller. Carlson condemned Neff's posts on the second episode of Tucker Carlson Tonight that aired after the posts were initially reported.

By October 2020, Tucker Carlson Tonight averaged 5.3 million viewers, with the show's monthly average becoming the highest of any cable news program in history at that point. In the 25–54 demographic, the show maintained an average viewership of just over a million, with 670,000 being between 18 and 49. Carlson's program saw a dip in viewership following the aftermath of the 2020 election, losing out to Anderson Cooper 360° in the 25–54 demographic, which Carlson had maintained a hold of the prior month. In 2020, Tucker Carlson Tonight and The Sean Hannity Show became the first cable news programs to finish a full year with viewership in excess of four million.

In the week following the inauguration of Joe Biden as president, Tucker Carlson Tonight remained the only cable news program not to see a drop in viewership, slightly increasing from where it stood one week prior and reclaiming its lead among the 25–54 demographic. It remained the most-watched news-related cable show as of mid-2021. Through May 2022 it was a close second to The Five, while leading in the 25–54 demographic.

==== Tucker Carlson Today ====
In February 2021, Carlson announced a multiyear deal with Fox News to host a new weekly podcast and series of monthly specials dubbed Tucker Carlson Originals on sister streaming service Fox Nation, which released on March 29. In spring of 2021, he began hosting a show on Fox Nation called Tucker Carlson Today.

==== Departure from Fox News ====
On the morning of Monday, April 24, 2023, Fox News dismissed Carlson and the executive producer of his evening show. It does not appear that Carlson received advance notice of his dismissal, given that on Friday, April 21, in what became his final show's sign-off, he told his viewers that he would "be back on Monday". As of October 2023, a rotation of guest hosts fill Carlson's old slot until a permanent replacement is found. On April 26, Carlson responded to his departure by tweeting a video that was watched millions of times.

Fox did not provide a reason for Carlson's termination. The Los Angeles Times wrote that the Chairman of Fox Corporation, Rupert Murdoch was responsible for the firing, and that a pending lawsuit from former Fox producer Abby Grossberg and Carlson's coverage of the January 6 U.S. Capitol insurrection both influenced the decision. The Wall Street Journal wrote that Carlson was dismissed due to private messages in which he criticized Fox's management, using vulgar and offensive language. In May, The New York Times reported that in one such message Carlson expressed racist views by criticizing three Trump supporters who were beating one antifa activist: "It's not how white men fight." Less than a week before his ouster Fox retained law firm Wachtell, Lipton, Rosen & Katz to investigate Tucker over this and potentially other messages due to liability concerns. The Washington Post wrote that the decision to oust Carlson was made by Murdoch's son, Lachlan, and Fox CEO Suzanne Scott. Fox was reported to have a "stockpile" of damaging information that they would be ready to release in case of any retaliation made by Carlson; the network denied this, however.

=== 2023–present: Tucker on Twitter / Tucker on X ===
In a video on his Twitter feed on May 9, 2023, Carlson said he would relaunch his show on Twitter. Just before making the announcement, Carlson's attorneys sent a letter to Fox executives, alleging that Rupert Murdoch and other senior executives "intentionally" broke their promises to him, an alleged breach of contract that he says ought to free him from his non-compete clause. Fox News reportedly sent him a cease and desist after the first episode aired.

The first episode of the show, called Tucker on Twitter, was released on June 6, 2023, and lasted just over 10 minutes. During the episode, Carlson claimed that the US had recovered an extraterrestrial starship and its pilot; that Volodymyr Zelenskyy is "sweaty and rat-like", and was persecuting Christians; that the destruction of the Kakhovka Dam was done by Ukrainian forces; that the Black Lives Matter riots were organized by an unknown entity; and that the truth behind the September 11 attacks was still classified.

In June 2023, he was reportedly seeking funds to start a new media company with Neil Patel.

On August 23, 2023, Carlson hosted Donald Trump on Tucker on X, the re-branded name of Twitter, deliberately to conflict with the first 2024 Republican debate. On September 6, 2023, Carlson interviewed Larry Sinclair, who had a criminal record, largely for crimes of deceit and who claimed that he had "had a night of crack cocaine-fueled sex with Barack Obama" 24 years before. The interview was criticized by many, including Elon Musk, owner of X.

In October, it was announced that 1789 Capital had invested in Tucker Carlson's new media company. According to 1789 Capital founder Omeed Malik, this was "one of [the] first investments" by the venture capital firm. In December, Carlson launched the new streaming service, called the Tucker Carlson Network, with both ad-supported and subscription-based content. Initially planned for Twitter/X, Musk's company was unable to deliver the needed technology. Justin Wells, a former executive producer at Fox for Carlson, will oversee programming.

==== Vladimir Putin interview ====
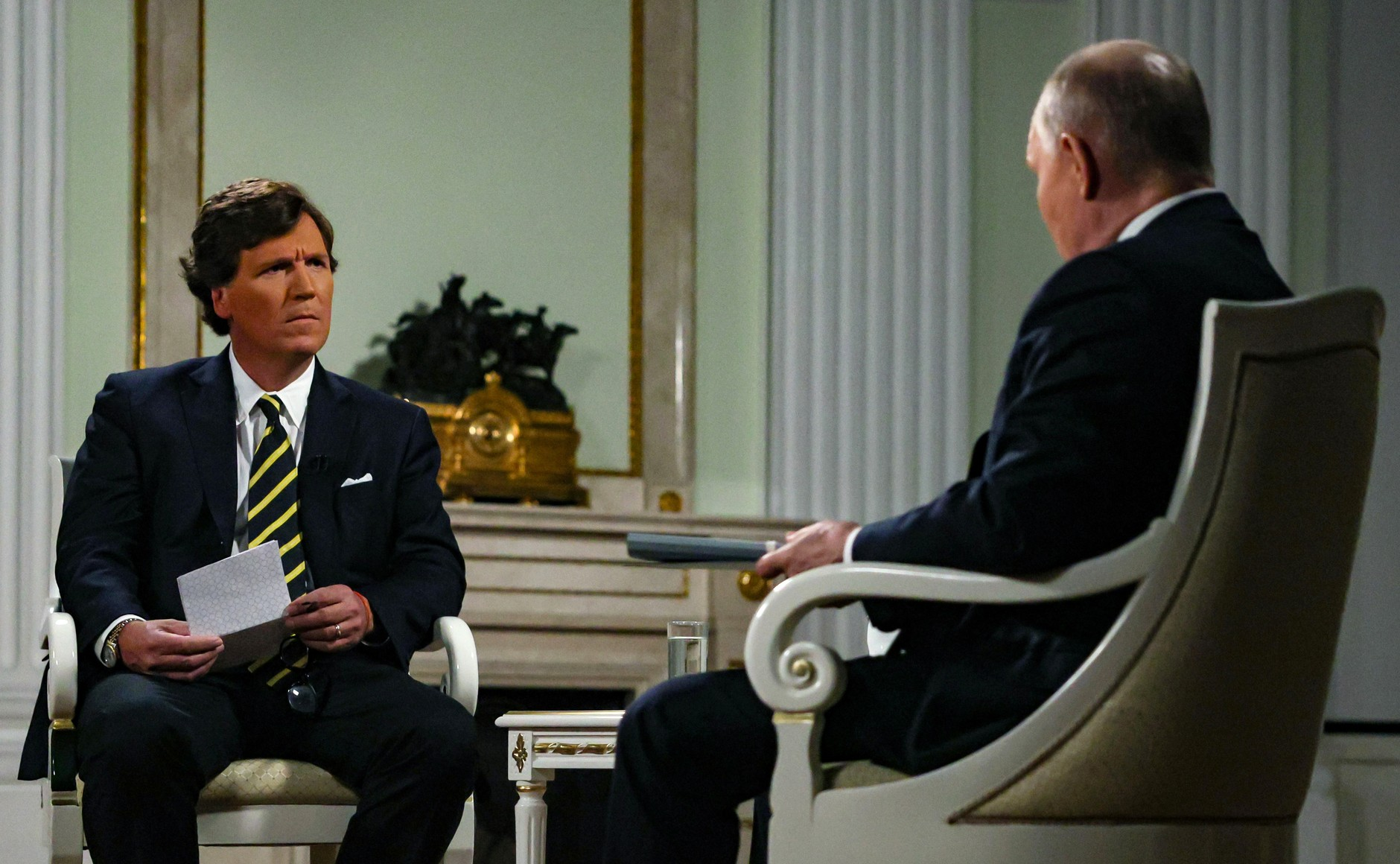
Carlson interviewing Russian president Vladimir Putin in February 2024

Carlson traveled to Russia in February 2024 to interview President Vladimir Putin. In the opinion of Tiffany Wertheimerher, Carlson "has been an outspoken defender of" Putin. It was Putin's first one-on-one interview with a Western journalist since he launched the Russian invasion of Ukraine in February 2022. Carlson said that while Ukraine's president Volodymyr Zelenskyy had been given a platform, "not a single Western journalist has bothered to interview the president of the other country involved in this conflict, Vladimir Putin". This sparked backlash from some American and European journalists, who pointed out that they had repeatedly been denied interviews with Putin, and that some had been expelled. The Kremlin Press Secretary, Dmitry Peskov, said Carlson had been allowed an interview because "his position is different", saying, "It's not pro-Russian, not pro-Ukrainian, it's pro-American. It starkly contrasts with the stance of traditional Anglo-Saxon media".

Some independent Russian journalists were angered by Carlson's words, noting that at least 1,000 independent journalists had fled Russia due to new censorship laws that ban criticism of the war. They also highlighted that two American journalists were currently imprisoned by Russia: Evan Gershkovich of The Wall Street Journal and Alsu Kurmasheva of Radio Free Europe. Tucker raised this issue during the Putin interview. Evan Gershkovich, Alsu Kurmasheva, and Paul Whelan were released on August 1, 2024, as part of a prisoner exchange.

After the death of prominent Kremlin critic Alexei Navalny in a Russian prison days after the interview, Carlson faced fresh criticism for holding the interview with Putin and saying that "leadership requires killing people". Carlson called Navalny's death "barbaric and awful" in a statement to The New York Times.

In 2024 Carlson also interviewed Russian philosopher Aleksandr Dugin who is argued to be one of Putin's biggest ideological influencers as well as the inspiration behind Putin's war in Ukraine. During the interview Carlson said that Dugin's writing was so dangerous that his work has been "banned by the Biden administration.”

=== 2024–present: The Tucker Carlson Show ===
In May 2024, Carlson launched the weekly commentary podcast The Tucker Carlson Show. At its launch, Slate wrote that Carlson had diminished popularity. Quickly, though, Carlson regained his popularity, and The Tucker Carlson Show soon became one of the highest-rating political podcasts; it was the #1 most popular on Spotify in July 2024.

On September 2, 2024, Carlson hosted podcaster and amateur historian Darryl Cooper on Tucker on X. Without correction or contradiction from Carlson, Cooper claimed the Nazi Holocaust was not intentional, and otherwise departed from the historical consensus regarding World War II, causing controversy. Cooper also called Winston Churchill "the chief villain" of World War II.

Three days after the interview, White House senior deputy press secretary Andrew Bates condemned Carlson for "giving a microphone to a Holocaust denier who spreads Nazi propaganda". On September 9, all 24 Democratic Jewish members of Congress issued a joint statement saying that they were "appalled that Tucker Carlson hosted and promoted Nazi apologist and Holocaust denier Darryl Cooper on his podcast". Republican congressman Mike Lawler said in his own condemnation of Carlson that "platforming known Holocaust revisionists is deeply disturbing."

On October 28, 2025, Carlson hosted white nationalist political commentator Nick Fuentes. Kevin Roberts, president of The Heritage Foundation, publicly defended Carlson for having Fuentes onto his podcast; this ignited a debate about antisemitism among conservatives. Republicans including Ted Cruz and Mitch McConnell condemned the Heritage Foundation's defense of Carlson.

==== Split with Trump ====
Carlson publicly criticized Trump's policy military intervention against Iran, which triggered backlash from Trump. In a phone interview with Rachael Blade of The Inner Circle on March 2, 2026, Trump declared that both Carlson and Megyn Kelly, another right-wing commentator who criticized Trump's Iran policy, "aren't MAGA." On March 5, 2026, ABC News reporter Jonathan Karl revealed that Trump stated to him that "Tucker has lost his way," and "I knew that a long time ago, and he's not MAGA. MAGA is saving our country. MAGA is making our country great again. MAGA is America first, and Tucker is none of those things. And Tucker is really not smart enough to understand that." In response to Trump "throwing him out of MAGA," Carlson told Oliver Darcy of Status that "There are times I get annoyed with Trump, right now definitely included," while also claiming that "but I'll always love him no matter what he says about me." On March 18, 2026, one day after he resigned from the Trump Administration, former National Counterterrorism Center head Joe Kent appeared on The Tucker Carlson Show, insisting that Israel influenced U.S. participation in the Iran War. In addition, Kent alleged to Carlson that he learned that right-wing American political activist Charlie Kirk had broken with Israel shortly before his murder.

On the April 20, 2026, episode of The Tucker Carlson Show, he and his brother Buckley expressed regret for their support of the president. Tucker stated, "You know, we'll be tormented by it for a long time. I will be. And I want to say I'm sorry for misleading people. It was not intentional."

== Writing ==
Carlson authored the memoir Politicians, Partisans, and Parasites: My Adventures in Cable News, published by Warner Books in September 2003, about his television news experiences. It received favorable reviews from Publishers Weekly and the Washingtonian, who both complimented the book for its humor.

In May 2017, Carlson, represented by the literary and creative agency Javelin, signed an eight-figure, two-book deal with Simon & Schuster's conservative imprint, Threshold Editions. His first book in the series, Ship of Fools: How a Selfish Ruling Class is Bringing America to the Brink of Revolution, was released in October 2018, and debuted at No. 1 on The New York Times Best Seller list. His second book, The Long Slide: Thirty Years in American Journalism, was released in August 2021.

In 2023, a biography of Carlson titled Tucker was released. The book was written by Chadwick Moore with the help of Carlson, who had given the author more than 100 hours of interviews. Moore had stated that the book was intended to tell the story of Carlson's exit from Fox News from the former host's perspective. The book performed poorly, with just over 3,000 copies sold during the first week after its release.

== Political views ==
Carlson has been described in the media as a conservative, paleoconservative, (Note: Paleoconservative writer Paul Gottfried has objected to Carlson being described as a paleoconservative.) right-wing extremist, and far-right. In 2021, Time magazine said Carlson "may be the most powerful conservative in America". Writing for New York magazine's Intelligencer in 2019, Park MacDougald called Carlson a "Middle American radical", which he described as someone who holds populist economic beliefs; hostility to corporatocracy; fervent positions on nationalism, race, and immigration; and a preference for a strong U.S. president. MacDougald identified this form of radicalism as the ideological core of Trumpism. Carlson is noted for circulating white nationalist views and terminology into mainstream political discourse, in particular, repackaging the fringe racist "replacement" conspiracy theory into a version that accuses Democrats and "elites" of forcing demographic change. More virulent versions of the conspiracy theory have been cited by gunmen in several mass shootings targeting minorities; Carlson has denounced the attacks.

Carlson formerly identified as a Republican. He was previously registered as a Democrat in Washington, D.C., from 2006 to 2020. In 2017, Carlson said his registration as a Democrat was to gain the right to vote in the primaries for mayoral elections in the district, and that he nevertheless "sincerely despise[s]" the Democratic Party and "always vote[d] for the more corrupt candidate over the idealist" in order to favor the status quo and stem progressivism. Carlson campaigned for Republicans and Republican-affiliated causes during his time as a Democrat. In June 2026, Carlson stated that he was "out" of the Republican Party.

=== Parties and candidates ===
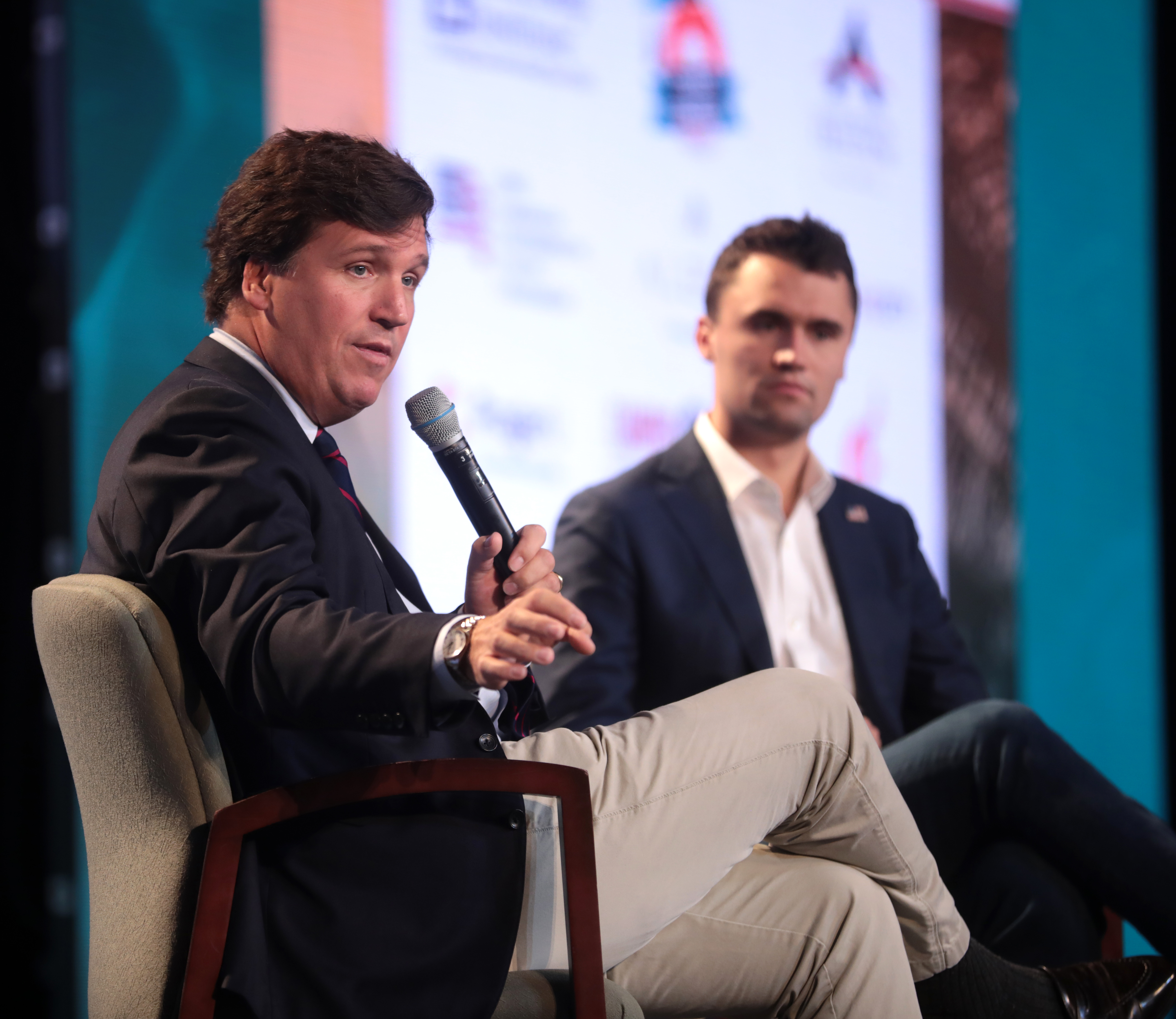
Carlson with Charlie Kirk in 2018

In public correspondence in Slate with Texas Monthly's Evan Smith on November 29, 1999, Carlson agreed with Smith's low opinion of Donald Trump, who was then running for president with the Reform Party. Carlson wrote that Trump was "the single most repulsive person on the planet" and that the Reform Party consisted of "a bunch of wackos". Separately, he criticized the party's eventual nominee, Pat Buchanan. In his 2018 book, Ship of Fools, Carlson wrote that he had adopted some of Buchanan's views.

Carlson voted for George W. Bush in the 2000 election. Carlson told Salon in 2003 that some Washington conservatives suspected he was "secretly liberal" because he liked John McCain. Carlson said in an interview, "by my criteria, Bush isn't much of a conservative". Carlson did not vote in the 2004 election, citing his souring on the Iraq War, his disillusionment with the once small-government Republican Party, and his disappointment with Bush and like-minded conservatives.

Carlson was reportedly floated as a potential candidate for the Libertarian nomination in the 2008 presidential election. He was included in polling at the 2008 Libertarian National Convention, with unconfirmed speculation arising that he was personally funding the effort. Carlson spoke at Ron Paul's independent Rally for the Republic convention, opposite the official 2008 Republican National Convention, in Saint Paul, Minnesota, which served as a "message of revolt to the Republican Party" and a general celebration of Paul's policy proposals.

He expressed his disappointment with the Republican nominee for the 2012 election, Mitt Romney, and the health care reform he signed in 2006 as governor of Massachusetts, which contained an individual mandate, saying, "out of 315 million Americans, the Republican Party managed to find the one guy who couldn't run on Obamacare."

Writing for Politico in January 2016, Carlson expressed his support for Donald Trump's candidacy and his positions, such as his proposed "Muslim ban", and criticized the other Republican candidates for not similarly making immigration a core issue. (Note: Carlson has said he did not vote for Trump in either 2016 or 2020, not voting at all in the former election, and voting for Kanye West in the latter.) During the Trump presidency, Carlson was described in Politico as "perhaps the highest-profile proponent of 'Trumpism' – a blend of anti-immigrant nationalism, economic populism and America First isolationism". Carlson's commentaries did not uniformly praise Trump, but he had frequent scorn for Trump's critics; some commentators called Carlson an exemplar of "anti-anti-Trump" arguments. In March 2023, Carlson defended Trump after he was indicted in New York, calling the indictment "election interference". Despite his praise for Trump, he has at times been critical. Carlson criticized the assassination of Qasem Soleimani, ordered by Trump in January 2020 and said in June 2020 that Trump had let Black Lives Matter protests go too far. In private correspondence, he referred to Trump as a "demonic force" and wrote, "I hate him passionately".

Following the 2020 election, Carlson reportedly told people he had voted for independent candidate Kanye West, though Politico points out that it was unclear whether Carlson "was serious or merely joking". In July 2021, Carlson told Time magazine that the Republican Party is "inept and bad at governing" and "much more effective as an oppositional force than it is as a governing party".

Carlson supported JD Vance in the 2022 Republican U.S. Senate primary in Ohio and privately persuaded Trump to endorse him despite Vance's past anti-Trump comments. Former Hawaii congresswoman and Democratic presidential primary contender Tulsi Gabbard was a substitute host on Tucker Carlson Tonight in 2022; she appeared on the show the night she left the Democratic Party in October 2022, to Carlson's praise.

=== Abortion ===
Carlson opposes abortion and has said it is the only political issue he considers non-negotiable. Carlson has described Roe v. Wade as "the most embarrassing court decision handed down in the last century".

In 2024, Carlson dismissed the link between climate change and the increased frequency and intensity of hurricanes, attributing it instead to abortion. Explaining his rationale, he has compared abortion to ritual sacrifice, saying that one "can't participate in human sacrifice without consequences".

=== Death penalty ===
Carlson wrote in 2000 that capital punishment "deserves more vigorous debate", and in 2003 told Salon, "I'm opposed to the death penalty as I am adamantly opposed to abortion". After saying on Fox News in 2010 that Michael Vick "should have been executed" for dog fighting, Carlson stated that he is "not comfortable with the death penalty under any circumstances".

=== Guns ===
Carlson supports the right to keep and bear arms. He has opposed gun control and the assault weapons ban. He has debated several Democrats on gun control. In 2015, he said Australian gun laws were "insane" and "childish". In March 2018, he criticized Donald Trump for comments supporting gun control after the Stoneman Douglas High School shooting. In a 2019 interview, Carlson said he owns an AR-15 style rifle and said "all my guns are working-class guns". He has a concealed carry permit in the District of Columbia.

Carlson aired segments defending Kyle Rittenhouse, a 17-year-old who shot three protesters, killing two, in August 2020 in confrontations during unrest after a police shooting in Kenosha, Wisconsin. At trial, Rittenhouse pled self defense, and was found not guilty on all charges.

=== Economics ===
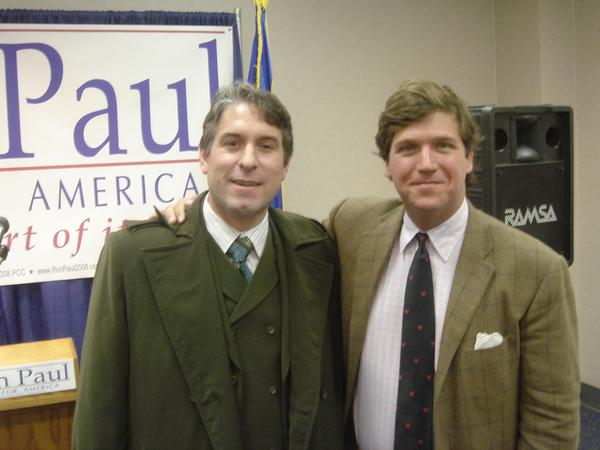
Carlson at a 2007 Ron Paul event

Early in his career, Carlson supported libertarian economics. He supported Ron Paul's 1988 presidential candidacy, when Paul ran as the candidate for the Libertarian Party, along with his 2008 presidential candidacy, when Paul ran as a Republican. Carlson said in 2004, "I hate all nanny-state regulations, such as seat belt laws and smoking bans." From 2009 through 2015, Carlson was a senior fellow at the Cato Institute, a libertarian think tank.

Since 2018, he has promoted more populist economics, attacking libertarianism, saying "market capitalism is not a religion" and portraying some Republicans as "controlled by the banks". In an interview, he said that economic and technological change that occurs too quickly can cause widespread social and political upheaval, and praised President Theodore Roosevelt, saying his intervention in the economy in the early 1900s may have prevented a communist revolution in the United States. In 2019 on Tucker Carlson Tonight, Carlson said America's "ruling class" are, in effect, the "mercenaries" behind the decline of the American middle class, and "any economic system that weakens and destroys families is not worth having. A system like that is the enemy of a healthy society." He cited parallels between the problems of inner cities and rural areas as evidence that the "culture of poverty" cited by conservatives as the cause of urban decline "wasn't the whole story", and that "Certain economic systems allow families to thrive. Thriving families make market economies possible." In January 2019, Carlson used a The Washington Post op-ed by Romney to criticize what he described as the "mainstream Republican" worldview, consisting of "unwavering support for a finance-based economy.

Carlson has criticized hedge funds (singling out the Republican donor Paul Singer in 2019) and private equity (in criticizing Mitt Romney, former CEO of Bain Capital). He described the business model of firms like Bain as: "Take over an existing company for a short period of time, cut costs by firing employees, run up the debt, extract the wealth and move on, sometimes leaving retirees without their earned pensions. ... Meanwhile, a remarkable number of the companies are now bankrupt or extinct." He attacked payday lenders, saying they "loan people money they can't possibly repay" and "charge them interest that impoverishes them" He praised Democratic presidential candidate Elizabeth Warren's economic plan and called her book The Two Income Trap "one of the best books I've ever read on economics".

=== Environment ===
On his show, Carlson frequently hosts guests who downplay the scientific consensus on climate change, and disagreed with Bill Nye on the subject. Carlson has also said that he does not consider climate change a threat. Carlson argues that global warming will have many positive effects on Earth, namely "more arable land in places like Canada and northern Europe".

In 2023, Carlson, Clean Ocean Action, and multiple Republicans criticized New Jersey and New York's use of wind power, falsely claiming that it has been contributing to the deaths of whales.

In November 2025, Carlson promoted the chemtrail conspiracy theory.

=== Foreign policy ===
Carlson is skeptical of foreign intervention, has expressed regret for his public support of the U.S. invading Iraq in 2003, and has said "the U.S. ought to hesitate before intervening abroad". Carlson is known for some defenses of authoritarian foreign leaders, including President Vladimir Putin of Russia, President Nayib Bukele of El Salvador, and Prime minister Viktor Orbán of Hungary. Carlson was noted for defending Putin in the lead-up to Russia's 2022 invasion of Ukraine. Carlson's praise for Orbán included a visit and his online film Hungary vs. Soros.

==== Russia ====
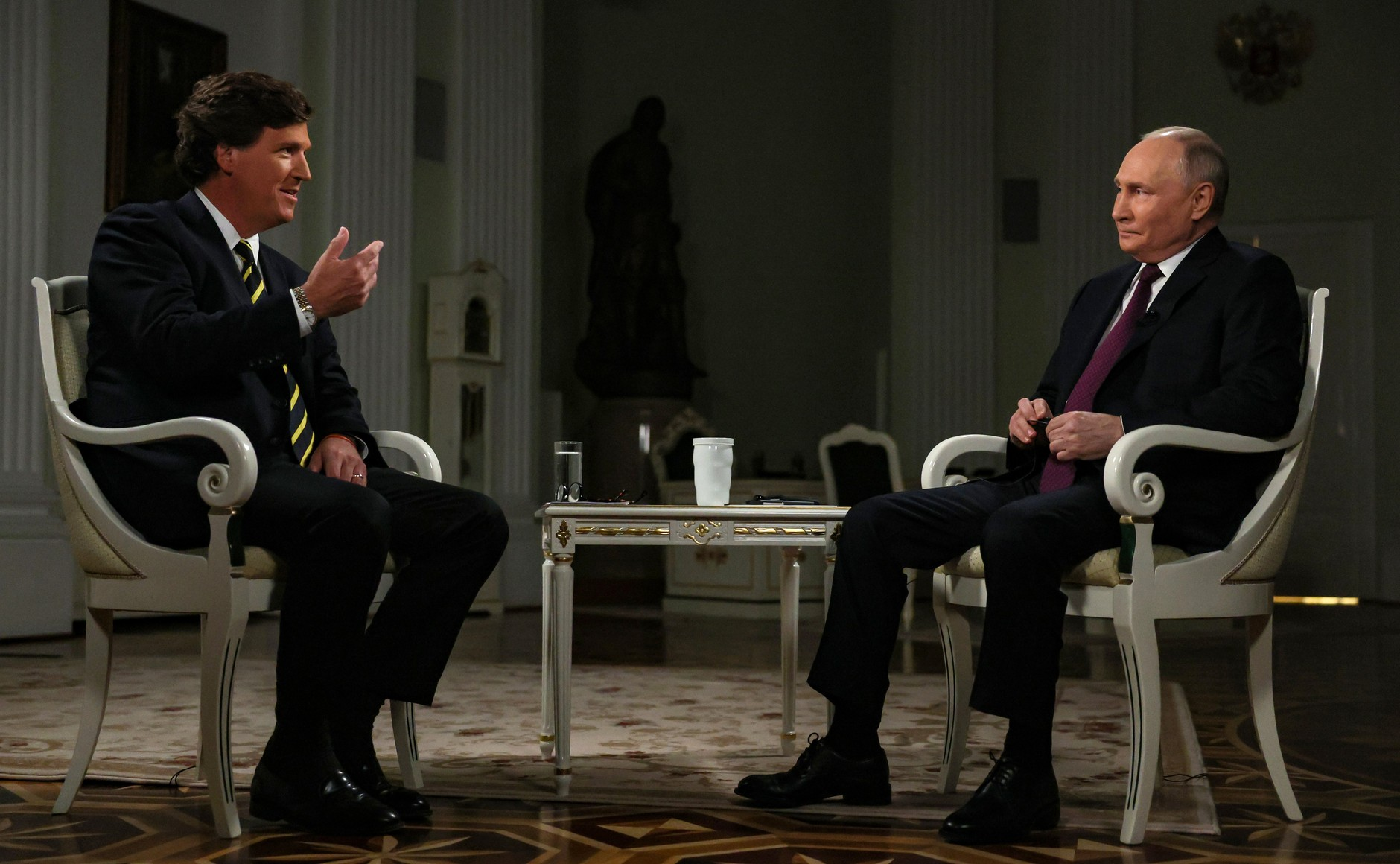
Carlson interviewing Vladimir Putin

Carlson is sympathetic to Russian president Vladimir Putin, has defended Putin's Russia, and has promoted pro-Russian disinformation and propaganda.

Carlson said in 2017 he did not consider Russia a serious threat to the United States, and called for the United States to work with Russia in the Syrian Civil War against a common enemy like the Islamic State of Iraq and the Levant (ISIS). He said that Putin does not hate the United States as much as American liberals do, and suggested there is no reason to dislike Putin, asking his viewers to consider whether Putin has ever called them racist or threatened to get them fired for disagreeing with him. Carlson said it is "not treason, it is not un-American" to support Putin.

In 2019, while discussing U.S. military aid to Ukraine during the Donbas War, Carlson said on his show: "Why shouldn't I root for Russia? Which I am". At the end of the show, he said he was joking. He subsequently said: "I think we should probably take the side of Russia if we have to choose between Russia and Ukraine".

In early 2022, Carlson downplayed Russia's military buildup on Ukraine's borders as a "border dispute". Although Carlson called the Russian invasion of Ukraine "awful" and acknowledged Putin's responsibility, he has promoted pro-Russian disinformation since then, such as a Russian conspiracy theory that the U.S. and Kyiv were developing biological weapons in Ukraine. Many of Carlson's broadcasts have been used by Russian state media to support their messaging, and Mother Jones reported that the Kremlin sent a memo to state media outlets saying it was "essential" to use video clips of Carlson "as much as possible". Mother Jones further observed Carlson was the only Western media pundit that the Kremlin adopted in this way.

Carlson's views of Putin's Russia have changed markedly since the 2000s. Back then, he agreed that Russia was becoming a "police state" where "freedom of the press is disappearing", and said that Putin was "in league with our enemies".

Peter Beinart of The Atlantic said Carlson has been an "apologist for Donald Trump on the Russia scandal". Carlson described the controversy over revelations that Donald Trump Jr. was willing to accept opposition research about Hillary Clinton from a Russian government official as a "new level of hysteria" and said that Trump Jr. had only been "gossiping with foreigners".

After the death of prominent Russian opposition activist Alexei Navalny in a Russian prison days after the interview, Carlson faced fresh criticism for holding the interview with Putin and saying that "leadership requires killing people". Carlson called Navalny's death "barbaric and awful" in a statement to The New York Times.

==== Iraq ====
Carlson initially supported the Iraq War. A year after the invasion of Iraq, he began criticizing the war, telling The New York Observer: "I think it's a total nightmare and disaster, and I'm ashamed that I went against my own instincts in supporting it." In 2004, Carlson wrote a commentary in Esquire accusing Bush of weakness after the September 11 attacks and in the invasion of Iraq. Carlson said "Iraq is a crappy place filled with a bunch of, you know, semi-literate primitive monkeys, that's why it wasn't worth invading.".

==== Iran ====
In July 2017, Carlson said that "we actually don't face any domestic threat from Iran". He asked Max Boot to "tell me how many Americans in the United States have been murdered by terrorists backed by Iran since 9/11?" According to The New York Times, Carlson played an influential role in dissuading Trump from launching military strikes against Iran in response to the shooting down of an American drone in June 2019. Carlson reportedly told Trump that if he listened to his hawkish advisors and went ahead with the strikes, he would not win re-election. In 2019, Carlson lobbied Donald Trump to fire his national security advisor, John Bolton. Carlson said Bolton was "demented" for seeking a military strike against Iran and accused him of undermining Trump by disagreeing publicly with Trump's decisions. Trump fired Bolton on September 10, 2019.

Carlson called the 2020 assassination of Qasem Soleimani a "quagmire". He criticized the "chest-beaters" who promote foreign interventions, particularly Senator Ben Sasse (R-NE), and asked, "By the way, if we're still in Afghanistan, 19 years, sad years, later, what makes us think there's a quick way out of Iran?"

Regarding the 2026 Iran war, Tucker Carlson stated that “This happened because Israel wanted it to happen. This is Israel’s war. This is not the United States’ war,” and accused the conflict of being started by "lies" spread by Israeli Prime Minister Benjamin Netanyahu. Carlson dismissed the idea that the conflict was based on the interests of the United States or Israel, claiming “You have that country breaking apart, and what does that mean? Hard to see that as a good thing for the rest of the world” and "“The United States didn’t make the decision here. Benjamin Netanyahu did.” Carlson also dismissed concerns about Iranian weapons and further alleged that “The point is regional hegemony. Really simple,” and that “Israel wants to control the Middle East.”

==== Syria ====
Carlson opposed overthrowing Syrian President Bashar al-Assad and has downplayed some of the Assad regime's human rights violations in the Syrian Civil War. In April 2018, Carlson questioned whether Assad was responsible for the Douma chemical attack that had occurred a few days earlier and killed dozens. In November 2019, Carlson repeated this claim and queried whether the attack had happened at all. Carlson suggested that a similar attack that occurred the year before (the Khan Shaykhun chemical attack), which was attributed to Assad's forces and which the OPCW JIM indicated was carried out with sarin that bore the regime's signature, was a false flag attack perpetrated to falsely implicate the Assad government. Carlson compared Assad's war crimes during the Syrian Civil War to Saudi Arabia's war crimes in Yemen.

==== Israel ====
In 2006, Carlson appeared live from Israel during the 2006 Lebanon War between Israel and Hezbollah in southern Lebanon. Early on in the conflict, Carlson proposed that Lebanon fight and push out Hezbollah instead of going to war with Israel. During the conflict, he criticized Syria's involvement in the conflict in supporting Hezbollah and later expressed some support for the Israel Defense Forces. However, he also criticized the tactics used by the Israel Defense Forces in fighting Hezbollah.

During the Gaza war, Carlson criticized both President Joe Biden and Republican House speaker Mike Johnson for their support for military aid to Israel and called for American neutrality during the conflict. He declared Israel guilty of war crimes. Commentators have described him as part of a growing faction within the Republican Party that is either indifferent, or directly opposed, to Zionism.

In 2025, Carlson criticized the Trump administration's support for Israel in the Gaza war. In June, he criticized Trump's support for Israeli strikes against Iran, opposing the possible involvement of the United States in a war with Iran. Carlson said: "I think this can be stopped. But it's going to require a really tough step which is to say to our client state which is to say, 'We love you, we want to help you, we don't think you're acting in your own interest. We're not going to … imperil American national security, the American economy, or America itself on your behalf."

Carlson was accused of making antisemitic comments at the memorial service of Charlie Kirk by suggesting he supported the conspiracy theory that Jews or Israel were responsible for Kirk's assassination. Carlson said that Kirk's killing reminded him of the death of Jesus Christ, who was killed by powerful people for telling the truth. Carlson claimed that Kirk loved Israel, but he disliked Israeli prime minister Benjamin Netanyahu and was "appalled by what was happening in Gaza", and most of all, he disliked that Netanyahu was using the United States to wage wars on Israel's behalf. In December 2025, the pro-Israel and Jewish advocacy group StopAntisemitism called Carlson "Antisemite of the Year" for several remarks he made in 2025 that were critical of Israel and allegedly antisemitic.

In February 2026, Carlson made a brief visit to Israel to conduct an interview with U.S. Ambassador Mike Huckabee at Ben Gurion International Airport. After the interview, Carlson publicly claimed that he and his team were detained and questioned by Israeli airport security before departing the country. Israeli authorities, including the Israel Airports Authority, and the United States Embassy in Jerusalem stated that the encounter involved only routine passport control questions. Video footage published by The Jerusalem Post showed Carlson smiling, embracing, and posing for photos with airport staff following the encounter.

In November 2026, he claimed without evidence that Netanyahu was "cornered and desperate" and therefore pushing Trump to attack Iran.

==== Hungary ====
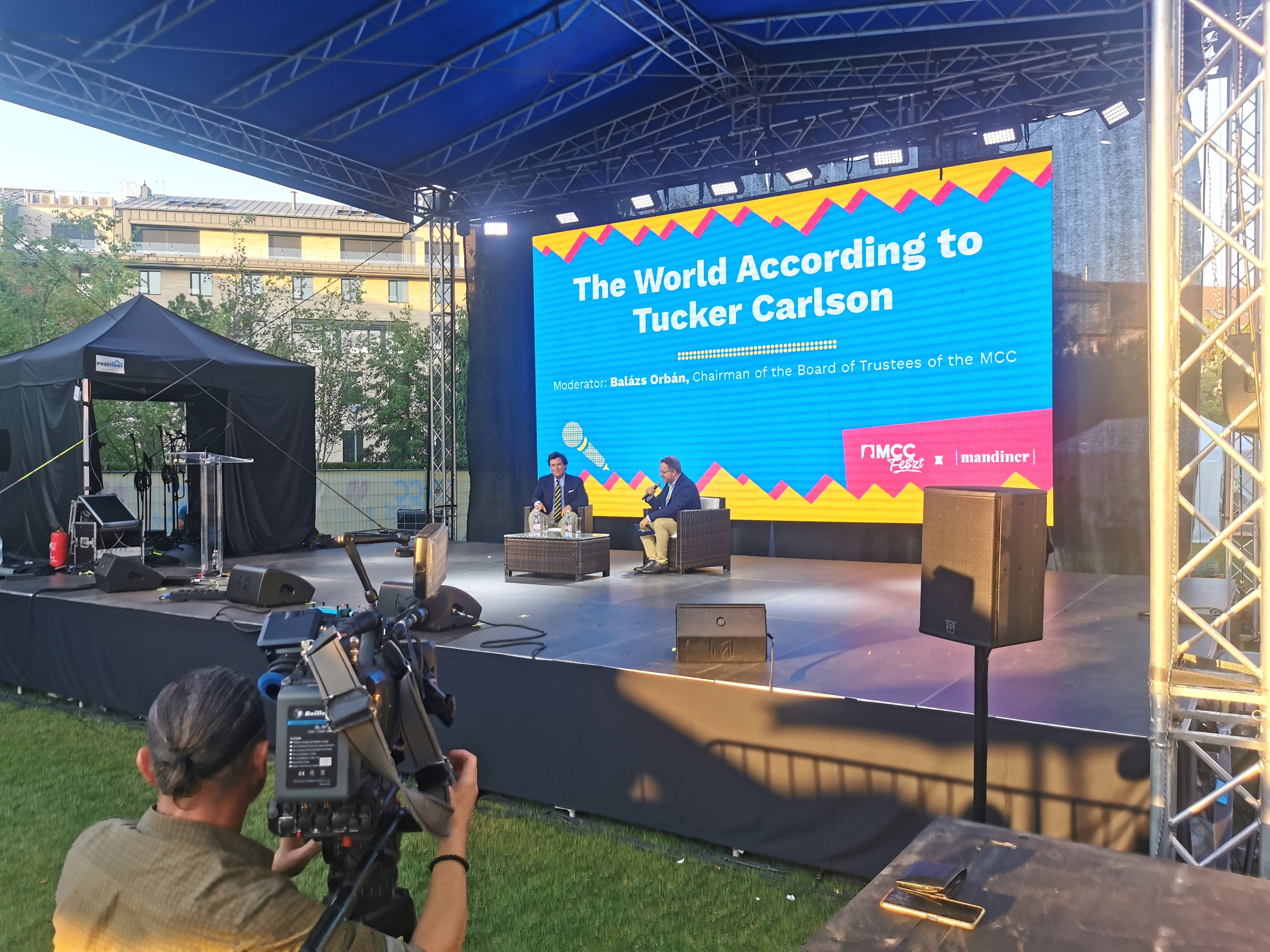
Carlson at MCC Fest After

In August 2021, Carlson traveled to Hungary, broadcasting from Budapest. He praised the country and its prime minister, Viktor Orbán, for rejecting asylum seekers on its border, and ridiculed the idea that Orbán was authoritarian. He spoke at a conference sponsored by the Mathias Corvinus Collegium. In January 2022, Carlson released the film Hungary vs. Soros on Fox Nation. According to Vox, it promoted conspiracy theories about Soros and suggested that criticism of the Hungarian government was a function of jealousy from the political left. The Open Society Foundations, a group founded by Soros, called the film "anti-American propaganda", and its Vice President Laura Silber stated that "Carlson appears to prefer authoritarian rule, state capture of media and the courts, crony corruption and rigged elections."

==== Serbia ====
Carlson has expressed sympathetic views and support of Serbia and its President, Aleksandar Vučić, on numerous occasions. In August 2023, Carlson visited Hungary, where he also paid a visit to the Embassy of Serbia in Budapest, meeting personally with the Serbian Minister of Sports, Zoran Gajić, the Minister of Finance, Siniša Mali, and Vučić. Carlson has repeatedly spread disinformation regarding the Yugoslav Wars, especially regarding Serbia's role in them and the 1999 NATO bombing of Yugoslavia, which effectively brought to an end the War in Kosovo. Carlson has used the example of NATO's intervention in Serbia in 1999 to claim that it is not a defensive but an offensive organization, describing the campaign as a "bombing of Christians in Yugoslavia" which paved the way for the creation of Kosovo as an independent country while omitting to mention the ethnic cleansing of Albanians by Serbian forces that occurred during the war. Carlson repeated this narrative several times, including during a debate with British journalist and media personality Piers Morgan in January 2025.

==== Mexico ====
Carlson supported Trump's expansion of the Mexico–United States border wall, saying a wall was needed to "restore sovereignty" to the border.

In a July 2018 interview about Russian involvement in U.S. elections, Carlson claimed that Mexico had interfered in U.S. elections "more successfully" than Russia by "packing our electorate" through mass immigration. This assertion was disputed by journalist Philip Bump, who wrote that the number of Mexicans in the U.S. had decreased since 2009 and asked rhetorically: "What good has it done Mexico to have a number of its citizens move to the United States and gain the right to vote?"

In May 2019, Carlson defended Trump's decision to place tariffs on Mexico unless Mexico stopped illegal immigration to the United States. Carlson said, "When the United States is attacked by a hostile foreign power it must strike back, and make no mistake Mexico is a hostile foreign power."

==== El Salvador ====
Carlson has visited El Salvador on three occasions, twice under Nayib Bukele's administration, and routinely defended his strongman policies to reduce crime and combat the MS-13 gangs.

==== North Korea ====
In June 2019, when President Trump met North Korean leader Kim Jong-un at the Korean Demilitarized Zone, Carlson, who was touring with Trump, defended Trump's friendship with Kim. Carlson told Fox & Friends that the North Korean regime was "monstrous" and North Korea was a "disgusting place" but "On the other hand, you've got to be honest about what it means to lead a country. It means killing people". Carlson went on to argue that "a lot of countries commit atrocities including a number that we're closely allied with".

==== China ====
Carlson has said normalization of relations with China following President Richard Nixon's 1972 visit led to unforeseen consequences, and that America became progressively worse off for it. He criticized LeBron James for speaking out against Daryl Morey, the latter having tweeted in support of the 2019–2020 Hong Kong protests, and referred to the former CEO of The Walt Disney Company, Bob Iger, as a "propagandist" for the Chinese Communist Party.

On November 20, 2020, The New York Times reported that Steve Bannon and Chinese businessman Guo Wengui had brought Li-Meng Yan to America to promote the COVID-19 lab leak theory, a theory that states COVID-19 was made in a Chinese laboratory and then escaped from the lab. Bannon and Guo set up appearances for Yan on Carlson's show to promote the theory. Carlson would later say that he did not endorse her theories. Nonetheless, Carlson still hosted her on his show for a second appearance.

==== Colonialism ====
In March 2021, Carlson stated that issues like the Latin American immigration crisis should be blamed on "other colonial powers centuries ago" instead of the United States, and suggested that the Spanish government, having a "legacy responsibility for what is happening in Latin America", should start by "sending back the gold now sitting in its central bank." Carlson's statements on Spain were criticized by Hermann Tertsch and Mamela Fiallo for supporting the Spanish Black Legend, though Fiallo's rebuttal article in La Gaceta was retracted in November 2023 after Carlson appeared with Santiago Abascal in support of the 2023 Spanish protests.

After the death of Queen Elizabeth II in September 2022, Carlson opined that the British Empire, although "not perfect", had brought civilization to regions it occupied with "decency unmatched by any empire in human history". He was criticized in India by figures including the politician and historian Shashi Tharoor, who had written a book detailing atrocities under Crown Rule in India.

=== Freedom of speech ===
In September 2025, Carlson criticized Attorney General Pam Bondi for attempting to exploit the assassination of Charlie Kirk to suppress free speech in the United States.

=== Immigration and race ===
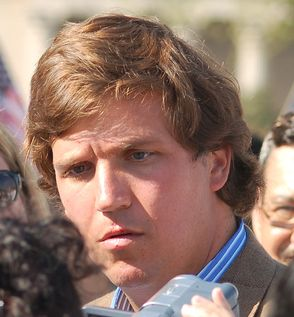
Carlson at the Immigrants' Rights rally in Washington Mall, 2006

Carlson is a frequent critic of immigration, and has been described by multiple writers as demonizing both documented and undocumented immigrants. White grievance politics is a persistent theme in Carlson's commentary. Sources such as CNN and The Washington Post have said Carlson promotes racism, a charge he denies, saying in 2018, "I'm not a racist. I hate racism." Carlson has repeatedly promoted a conspiracy theory that Democrats are seeking "demographic replacement" to increase their voter base, and in 2021 he described this as "the Great Replacement", using white nationalist terminology. Carlson has described white supremacy as "not a real problem in America". Heidi Beirich of the Southern Poverty Law Center has said that "Carlson probably has been the No. 1 commentator mainstreaming bedrock principles of white nationalism in [the U.S.]." Terry Smith, a law professor at St. Thomas University, has called Carlson's rhetoric an example of white identity politics. University of Michigan professor Alexandra Stern has written that Carlson propagates demographic fear. Neoconservative pundit Bill Kristol described Carlson's commentaries in 2018 as "close now to racism" and "ethno-nationalism of some kind, let's call it".

==== Racism and white supremacy ====
Carlson has compared the Obama administration's stance on anti-police protests to Nazism for "[categorizing] people by race", and he has alleged that the George Floyd protests were about "ideological domination" rather than police brutality. The latter comment prompted several advertisers to boycott his program. Carlson has falsely claimed that Floyd was not killed by officer Derek Chauvin and that Chauvin was only found guilty because the jurors felt threatened by rioters.

When Mitt Romney, the 2012 Republican nominee for president, denounced Trump in March 2016, saying Trump made a "disqualifying and disgusting response" by evading questions about former Ku Klux Klan Grand Wizard David Duke's support, Carlson criticized Romney and dismissed his speech by suggesting "Obama could have written this."

After Neff, his head writer, was fired for hateful blog posts in 2020, Carlson said of the posts, "They have no connection to the show. It is wrong to attack people for qualities they cannot control." Separately, Carlson said in 2017 that he does not approve of white supremacy. In 2018, he criticized China's treatment of Muslims.

In 2022, in response to The New York Times publishing a report criticizing Carlson and his show, Carlson said that his show did not have a controversial opinion on race, saying: "Our view of race is really simple. We believe Martin Luther King Jr. We don't think your skin color is the most important thing about you. We think all people were created by God and should therefore be judged by what they do, not by how they look." Carlson has also offered praise for Malcolm X, saying that unlike other civil rights leaders, Malcolm X "didn't talk like a sharecropper. He spoke dignified standard English. He wasn't running a shakedown racket to fleece guilty white liberals."

==== Islam ====
In the past, Carlson has been critical of Islam and has hosted guests on his program that criticize Islam. He has described the existence of an "Islamic cult" and an "Islamic problem", describing it as a threat to the United States. He was critical of the Obama administration's terrorism policy, arguing that it should have considered Islam as a cause of terrorism. In 2019, advocacy group Media Matters for America released recordings of racist comments that Carlson made in 2006 including that Iraq was not worth invading because he believed it to be a country made up of "semi-literate primitive monkeys" and "lunatic Muslims who are behaving like animals".

Carlson has since reversed his views, In December 2025, Carlson called attacks on Muslim Americans "disgusting". In the same month, he claimed that radical Islam is not a threat to the US, and that to think otherwise is "insane". He further stated that such fears come from "the Israeli government and its many defenders and informal employees in the United States, of course". During a February 2026 visit to Jordan, Carlson said, "I am standing in front of a Christian monastery in an overwhelmingly Muslim country... and I am shocked above all by the beauty of it, by the care the government has taken to restore, to preserve, to beautify this area along the Jordan River just steps away from where my savior Jesus Christ was baptised by John 2,000 years ago and I am overwhelmed by it." In March 2026, Carlson claimed that "Sharia Law has made Islamic societies more advanced than the West", a statement which drew criticism from other right-wing commentators, who accused him of "romanticizing" Jihad. In June 2026, Carlson formally denounced his past statements on Islam and Muslims, stating "Many times, I said on television, 'The problem is Islam. The problem is Muslims. They all want to kill us. They're all crazy...' I believed that. Now, that's not true. Nothing about that is true, but I believed it".

==== Immigrants and the Great Replacement conspiracy theory ====
In 2018, Carlson described the effects of mass immigration on the United States using the terms dirtier, poorer, and more divided and said it "has badly hurt this country's natural landscape". On another 2018 episode, Carlson criticized multiculturalism in the United States, skeptically asking "how, precisely, is diversity our strength?" and whether any other institutions benefitted from a lack of commonalities. Talking about Hazleton, Pennsylvania, where Hispanics had quickly become a majority of the population, Carlson said it was "more change than human beings are designed to digest". In May 2019 he said, "The flood of illegal workers into the United States has damaged our communities, ruined our schools, burdened our healthcare system and fractured our national unity." In December 2019, he falsely claimed that immigrants were responsible for making the Potomac River "dirtier and dirtier".

Carlson has accused Democrats of supporting increased immigration to change the racial demographics of the United States to increase the Democratic voter base. Commentators and organizations such as the Anti-Defamation League (ADL) have described these views as endorsement of the Great Replacement conspiracy theory. Carlson has also accused President Joe Biden of engaging in eugenics and "Great Replacement" through a policy of increased immigration. Despite this, Carlson has challenged accusations that he believes the Great Replacement conspiracy theory, describing it as a "voting rights question". He has also questioned the popularity of the conspiracy theory after it was invoked by multiple white supremacist mass shooters, including the 2019 El Paso shooting and the 2022 Buffalo shooting, contradicting his previous endorsement of the conspiracy theory and calling its existence a "hoax".

==== South Africa ====
In August 2018, Carlson alleged that the South African government was targeting white farmers because "they are the wrong skin color" and falsely said the country's president had changed the constitution to allow land thefts from whites during ongoing land reform efforts. CBS News, Associated Press, The New York Times and The Wall Street Journal described Carlson's segment (with guest Marian Tupy of the Cato Institute) as false or misleading, because violence against farmers had reached an all-time low and the reforms had yet to pass and were primarily aimed at land that had fallen into disuse.

Following the Carlson segment, President Trump tweeted that he had instructed Secretary of State Mike Pompeo to "closely study the South Africa land and farm seizure and large scale killing of farmers". The South African government responded that Trump's tweet was "misinformed" and said it would address the matter through diplomatic channels. AfriForum, a South African non-governmental organization focused mainly on the interests of Afrikaners, took credit for Carlson's and Trump's statements, saying it believed that its campaign to influence American politics had succeeded.

The evening after the segment, Carlson acknowledged that the proposed amendment was still being debated and added that no farms had yet been expropriated, though he did not admit to having made errors. Carlson later said in an interview that his South Africa segment made "an argument against tribalism".

==== Ilhan Omar ====
Carlson concluded Tucker Carlson Tonight on July 9, 2019, with a three-minute monologue about Representative Ilhan Omar (D-MN), who was born in Somalia and immigrated to the United States as a refugee as an adolescent. Carlson accused Omar of being ungrateful to the United States, and called her "living proof that the way we practice immigration has become dangerous to this country". His monologue was described by The Guardian as "racially loaded" and "full of anti-immigrant rhetoric". Omar responded on Twitter, saying that "advertisers should not be underwriting this kind of dangerous, hateful rhetoric". The Daily Beast commented that Carlson had devoted numerous segments to criticizing Omar, and that largely due to "right-wing attacks that have then been amplified by members of Congress and the president", Omar had been receiving death threats since her election to Congress.

==== Kanye West interview ====
On the October 6 and 7, 2022 episodes of Tucker Carlson Tonight, Carlson aired an edited version of an interview with rapper and fashion designer Ye, also known by his birth name Kanye West. West and conservative commentator Candace Owens had recently been photographed at Paris Fashion Week wearing matching shirts that read "White Lives Matter", a phrase often associated with white supremacist groups. In his interview with Carlson, West said he had worn the shirt because he found it "funny" and agreed with the message. When Carlson asked West about a badge West was wearing on a lanyard around his neck, West stated that it was an image from an obstetric ultrasound, and added, "It just represents life. I'm pro-life"; he claimed without evidence "that there are more Black babies being aborted than born in New York City at this point."

On October 11, 2022, the Vice website Motherboard published leaked unaired footage from the interview. In the unaired footage, West expressed Black Hebrew Israelite views, stated he had received a COVID-19 vaccine, and claimed that paid child actors had been "placed into [his] house to sexualize [his] kids"; in one instance, referring to a Kwanzaa celebration at his children's school, West said, "I prefer my kids knew Hanukkah than Kwanzaa [sic]. At least it will come with some financial engineering." The leaked footage was heavily scrutinized in light of other antisemitic statements West had made on social media in the days after the Tucker Carlson Tonight interview aired, including an October 8 tweet in which he threatened to go "death con 3 [sic]" on Jewish people. Philip Bump of The Washington Post wrote that Carlson had presented "a very specific version" of West's remarks that "mirrored Carlson's rhetoric on race and politics". Ben Samuels of Haaretz wrote that the episode "brings Carlson's history of providing a platform for antisemitism further into focus".

=== Gender and sexuality ===
Carlson is an opponent of feminism. In a December 2021 segment despairing the falling labor participation rate of U.S. men, Carlson said, "Men and women are very different, extremely different. Society is built on their differences." He has alleged that feminists want girls to make gains at the expense of boys. He was rebuked by the U.S. military in March 2021 after he ridiculed maternity flight suits for U.S. women soldiers and described a decision by the Chinese military to build ships as "more masculine". He used the words pig and cunt to describe several individual women in remarks from 2006 to 2011 on the radio show Bubba the Love Sponge. In 2022, Carlson released The End of Men, a Tucker Carlson Original alleging a decline in American masculinity. The episode featured Raw Egg Nationalist, a pseudonymous author affiliated with neo-Nazi publishing house Antelope Hill.

Carlson has highlighted what he considers excesses of LGBT people on the political left. Some of his comments on air have been described as homophobic, including a 2006 radio conversation in which he and Bubba the Love Sponge used the word faggot to describe their affection for each other, and his 2007 description of an incident during high school of beating up a gay man who had made an advance on him in a public bathroom. In the same year, he called Democratic primary contenders cowards for not pledging to legalize same sex marriage and stated that he would support that. In 2021, Carlson belittled the paternity leave taken by U.S. Secretary of Transportation Pete Buttigieg, a gay man, joking that Buttigieg could be "trying to figure out how to breastfeed". Carlson's promotion of inflammatory rhetoric about LGBTQ controversies was scrutinized after the Colorado Springs nightclub mass shooting in November 2022. Carlson has strongly criticized the transgender rights movement, including saying hospitals that provide gender-affirming healthcare to minors are criminals who harm children, and that they should not be surprised to receive threatening phone calls.

In September 2023, Tucker Carlson interviewed a man who claimed to have had sex with Barack Obama. In a podcast interview with Piers Morgan in November 2025, Carlson repeatedly challenged Morgan to say the homophobic slur "faggot", questioning the "political correctness" around the word. When Morgan refused, Carlson insinuated that Morgan refused to say the slur because he was afraid of being arrested.

=== COVID-19 pandemic and vaccines ===
Carlson differed with Trump and some of his colleagues at Fox News in early 2020 by saying COVID-19 should be taken more seriously in the U.S., and he reportedly influenced then-President Trump to take the virus more seriously. Carlson blamed China for causing the pandemic. By May 2020, Carlson began to publicly question the severity of the virus. Carlson criticized stay-at-home orders brought on by the pandemic and defended protests against lockdowns in rural areas. In February 2022, he supported the Canada convoy protest against COVID-19 restrictions and called it "the single most successful human rights protest in a generation". He also claimed that some U.S. officials were overstating the deadliness of the virus – a claim that PolitiFact called mostly false. Carlson mentioned the anti-parasite medication ivermectin as a possible COVID-19 treatment, though the FDA warned against its use.

Carlson misrepresented the safety of COVID-19 vaccines and said that U.S. officials were "lying" about them. He has falsely suggested that COVID-19 vaccines suppress the immune system, and he has misrepresented federal data to claim that 30 Americans died after receiving the vaccine each day, misleading his audience by citing the unverified VAERS database that included deaths from unrelated causes. He has likened vaccine passports to segregationist Jim Crow laws, and he claimed that a vaccine mandate in the U.S. Armed Forces was designed to oust "the sincere Christians in the ranks, the free thinkers, the men with high testosterone levels, and anyone else who doesn't love Joe Biden". He has also falsely claimed that the government was attempting to "force people to take medicine they don't want or need" through door-to-door vaccines. Carlson says he has not been vaccinated against COVID-19.

Carlson routinely criticized National Institute of Allergy and Infectious Diseases director Anthony Fauci during Fauci's tenure. This criticism included repeated false allegations that Fauci was responsible for the creation of COVID-19, with Carlson also falsely claiming that Fauci lied about the origin of COVID-19 to sell vaccines. According to Jon Cohen in Science, "Carlson took facts out of context and cited long-debunked studies or reports to attack Fauci". Fauci responded to Carlson's remarks by calling them a "crazy conspiracy theory".

Carlson was a vocal critic of the use of face masks during the COVID-19 pandemic, calling people wearing masks outdoors "zealots and neurotics". He received significant public backlash for his claim that having children wear face masks was tantamount to child abuse and that it warranted a response "no different from your response to seeing someone beat a kid in Walmart". Carlson has pointed to the use of masks as evidence that vaccines do not work, falsely claiming that there would be no benefits to mask use with an effective vaccine.

=== 2020 election aftermath ===
Ahead of the 2020 election, in September, Carlson told viewers that Democrats were promoting mail-in voting to create "uncertainty over the outcome of the election, so they can manipulate the results". After Joe Biden won the election in November, Carlson raised false allegations of fraud in the election. On his show, he mentioned the names of purportedly dead individuals who voted in Georgia; investigative reporting subsequently found that some of the individuals whom he claimed to be dead were in fact alive. Carlson apologized on his show for the error. Carlson distanced himself from Trump's post-election legal fights, in which Carlson said the election was "not fair" but acknowledged that it still would not produce a Trump victory.

Later that month, Carlson cast doubt on unfounded conspiratorial claims made by former federal prosecutor Sidney Powell, who alleged that Venezuela, Cuba and unidentified communist interests had used a secret algorithm to hack into voting machines and commit widespread electoral fraud. Carlson said "what Powell was describing would amount to the single greatest crime in American history", but that Powell became "angry and told us to stop contacting her" when he asked for evidence of widespread voter fraud. Prominent defenders of Trump criticized Carlson for his skepticism, though Powell was dropped from Trump's legal team shortly afterward. Carlson later brought on Mike Lindell on January 26, 2021, whose company My Pillow was the largest advertiser on Tucker Carlson Tonight, to criticize Dominion Voting Systems and claim it had "hired hit groups and bots and trolls" to target him following his Twitter account's permanent suspension for promoting unfounded fraud claims.

In July 2021, Carlson suggested that "there actually was meaningful voter fraud in Fulton County, Georgia, last November" despite the state's election results being validated via both hand and machine recounts. PolitiFact found that none of the evidence provided by Carlson substantiated his conclusion. For example, because Trump and Biden ballots were sorted into separate piles during the hand recount, tally sheets with votes exclusively for either candidate are not indicative of fraud.

In August 2022, Carlson was deposed as part of a lawsuit by Dominion Voting Systems against Fox News over false claims of voter fraud made about the company. The following February, Dominion's legal team released texts and other products of discovery against Fox, revealing that Carlson privately doubted the false claims that the 2020 election was stolen and mocked Trump advisors, including Rudy Giuliani and Sidney Powell. Carlson texted to Laura Ingraham, "Sidney Powell is lying by the way. I caught her. It's insane" and "Our viewers are good people and they believe it." Carlson also texted Sean Hannity, saying Fox News White House correspondent Jacqui Heinrich should be fired for tweeting a fact-check of false claims Carlson and Trump circulated about Dominion. He wrote "Please get her fired. Seriously ... What the fuck? I'm actually shocked ... It needs to stop immediately, like tonight. It's measurably hurting the company. The stock price is down. Not a joke.", and said he "just went crazy on" a Fox executive over Heinrich's reporting. Heinrich's tweet was deleted by the next morning.

Also published were texts of Carlson regarding Donald Trump, with Carlson stating: "I hate him passionately". About Trump's presidency, he texted: "We're all pretending we've got a lot to show for it, because admitting what a disaster it's been is too tough to digest. But come on. There really isn't an upside to Trump." In March 2023, Carlson said in an interview that he was "enraged that my private texts were pulled" for the court case, and asserted: "I love Trump ... I think Trump is funny and insightful."

==== 2021 U.S. Capitol attack ====
In February 2021, after attorney general nominee Merrick Garland pledged at his confirmation hearing to supervise the prosecution of "white supremacists and others" involved in the January 6 United States Capitol attack, Carlson alleged, "There's no evidence that white supremacists were responsible for what happened on January 6. That's a lie." PolitiFact rated Carlson's claim false, because several rioters had known ties to white supremacist groups, according to court records and congressional testimony by law enforcement leaders, and video and photos from the incident showed white supremacist symbols prominently displayed. Philip Bump of The Washington Post wrote in an analysis that Carlson was blurring the lines between "being involved" and "being responsible for" to create a strawman in an effort to "undercut the public understanding of what happened and, by extension, to soften the implications for Trump and his supporters". Carlson has also inaccurately stated that "[n]ot a single person in the crowd on January 6 was found to be carrying a firearm."

In June 2021, Carlson promoted a conspiracy theory alleging that the Capitol storming was a "false flag" FBI operation intended to "suppress political dissent". He alleged that unindicted co-conspirators in rioters' indictments were government agents, saying, "FBI operatives were organizing the attack on the Capitol on January 6, according to government documents". Legal experts said Carlson's claim was unfounded because prosecutors cannot describe an undercover agent as an unindicted co-conspirator. One of the unindicted co-conspirators was readily identifiable as Stewart Rhodes, founder and leader of Oath Keepers, a far-right anti-government militia; another unindicted co-conspirator was likely the wife of an indicted alleged conspirator. Carlson's guest, Darren Beattie of Revolver News, (Note: Revolver has been promoted by Trump and his administration.) whose writing the segment was primarily based on, had been fired as a Trump speechwriter in 2018 after CNN asked the White House about his attendance at a gathering of white nationalists. Carlson also said Russian president Vladimir Putin raised "fair questions" when Putin mentioned the fatal police shooting of a rioter inside the Capitol while denying involvement in the poisoning of a Russian politician. Republican House members Matt Gaetz and Marjorie Taylor Greene quickly embraced Carlson's story about FBI involvement in the Capitol attack, and Republican congressman Paul Gosar entered the Revolver News story into the Congressional Record during a House Oversight Committee hearing.

In response to Joint Chiefs of Staff Chairman Mark Milley's defense of studying critical race theory "to understand white rage" as it concerns the storming, Carlson said, "Hard to believe that man wears a uniform. ... He's not just a pig, he's stupid!"

After Carlson criticized Senator Ted Cruz for calling the Capitol storming a "terrorist attack", Cruz appeared on Carlson's show on January 6, 2022, the anniversary of the event, and apologized for his words.

House Speaker Kevin McCarthy in early 2023 gave Carlson exclusive access to 44,000 hours of security surveillance video from the day of the Capitol attack. Carlson subsequently aired portions of it on his show to illustrate his own narrative concerning the event, painting it as "peaceful chaos" and condemning other media outlets as untruthful when portraying the attack as violent. The family of Brian Sicknick, a United States Capitol Police officer who died the day following the Capitol attack, and Capitol Police Chief Tom Manger condemned the segment, which also received reproach from Democratic and Republican politicians, including from the Republican leader of the Senate, Mitch McConnell. Carlson's presentation included video of Jacob Chansley—the "QAnon Shaman"—walking the halls of Congress, depicting him as a peaceful demonstrator being escorted by police who was unjustly prosecuted and incarcerated. Days after the presentation, Justice Department prosecutors stated in a court filing that the four minutes of video showed only a brief part of Chansley's activity and omitted his earlier incriminating behavior, concluding, "Chansley was not some passive, chaperoned observer of events for the roughly hour that he was unlawfully inside the Capitol."

Carlson repeatedly promoted a conspiracy theory that pro-Trump protestor Ray Epps was actually a federal agent engaged in a false flag operation to instigate the January 6 attack. Epps said he and his wife were subjected to threats and harassment, leading them to sell their home and business to go into hiding in another state. An attorney for Epps wrote Carlson in March 2023 demanding a public retraction of "false and defamatory statements."

==== Patriot Purge program ====
In late October 2021, Patriot Purge, a three-part series produced by Carlson, was released on the Fox Nation streaming service. Carlson broadcast a trailer that suggested the January 6 attack was a government false flag operation to implicate the right wing, with one speaker asserting that "the left is hunting the right". Carlson stated on-air that the government had "launched a new war" on American citizens and characterized his series as "rock-solid factually". Fact-checkers found the series contained numerous falsehoods and conspiracy theories. Michael Jensen, a senior researcher at the National Consortium for the Study of Terrorism and Responses to Terrorism, called it "political propaganda that is meant to rally a support base that has shown a willingness to mobilize on the basis of disinformation and lies. That's how we got Jan. 6 in the first place." Conservative writers Jonah Goldberg and Steve Hayes responded to the series by severing their ties to Fox News, declaring that the series was "a collection of incoherent conspiracy-mongering, riddled with factual inaccuracies, half-truths, deceptive imagery, and damning omissions". Bret Baier and Chris Wallace, prominent anchors in the network's news division, raised objections to the series to top executives of the Fox organization.

=== Alleged surveillance ===
In October 2020, Carlson alleged on his show that someone was reading his text messages, after documents he claimed had compromising information on Joe Biden's son, Hunter, were lost by the United Parcel Service and then quickly located. Carlson did not say what these documents contained. In November 2021, the Daily Mail published emails from a laptop owned by Hunter Biden, which appear to demonstrate a friendship between himself and Carlson.

On June 28, 2021, Carlson said on his program that "a whistleblower within the U.S. government" informed him that the National Security Agency (NSA) was "monitoring our electronic communications and is planning to leak them in an attempt to take this show off the air", adding, "The Biden administration is spying on us. We have confirmed that." That same day, a producer for Carlson filed an unusually broad Freedom of Information Act (FOIA) request with the NSA, seeking records, including "any communication between NSA officials regarding journalist Tucker Carlson", dating back to January 2019, before Biden became president. (Note: Details of the FOIA were obtained via a separate FOIA filed by The Intercept's Ken Klippenstein; Carlson derided both the website and journalist in a segment on July 8.) On June 29, the NSA tweeted a rare statement of denial, stating that Carlson has never been a target of its surveillance and it never had any intent to have his program taken off the air. Carlson responded on-air that the NSA did not deny reading his emails. (Note: By law, the NSA is prohibited from monitoring communications of Americans without a special court order based on concerns an American is a terrorist or an agent of a foreign power, though communications of Americans can be incidentally intercepted if they are communicating with a foreign person who is being monitored.) House Republican leader Kevin McCarthy asked House Intelligence Committee ranking member Devin Nunes to investigate.

Axios reported on July 7 that, shortly before Carlson made his allegation, he had been in contact with U.S.-based Kremlin intermediaries to arrange an interview with Vladimir Putin. The reporter of the Axios exclusive story, Jonathan Swan, later confirmed he had contacted Carlson seeking pre-publication comment, but said he had not told Carlson that anyone had shared the email contents with him. On that night's program, Carlson said that he had contacted people about interviewing Putin, but did not mention it to anyone because he did not want to "rattle the Russians, and make the interview less likely to happen". He said that the NSA had unmasked his identity and that "the contents of my emails left that building at the NSA and wound up with a news organization". On July 23, cybersecurity news website The Record wrote that Carlson had not been targeted by the NSA but had been unmasked after he was mentioned by third parties who were under surveillance, citing two anonymous sources. Fox News called the reported act "unacceptable". The New York Times observed there was a distinction between Carlson's communications being intercepted by the NSA and intercepts of foreigners who were discussing Carlson. The NSA inspector general's office announced in August 2021 that it was examining Carlson's allegation.

== Presidential politics ==
There has been speculation that Carlson could attempt a run for President of the United States in 2024 and 2028. In an episode of his podcast in 2024, Carlson stated that he would consider running for president in 2028, but also conceded that "I don't think I'd be very good at it."

In 2026, former Rep. Marjorie Taylor Greene publicly urged Carlson to seek the presidency, writing that he "would beat Trump if he ran." In a March 2026 interview on Piers Morgan Uncensored, when pressed on a possible presidential run, Carlson did not rule one out, saying "As for Ted Cruz, he says he’s running against me for president. I almost want to run for president just to debate Ted Cruz."

== Rhetorical style ==
Carlson's rhetorical style and debating tactics have drawn close attention from writers and other public figures.

In arguments, Carlson can quickly shift between personas as a devil's advocate and a moralizing truth teller, and simultaneously appear outraged and blasé – a use of contradiction that Lili Loofbourow, writing for Slate, referred to as a "joking/not-joking loophole" historically used by radio shock jocks. James Carville, a Democratic strategist and friend of Carlson who has appeared on his shows, called Carlson "one of the world's great contrarians". Touching upon this, Kelefa Sanneh, writing for The New Yorker said that one of Carlson's gifts is to make any position he takes on an issue "seem like a brave rebellion against someone else's way of thinking."

Carlson has said he especially targets the "moral preening" of people he sees as having a sensibility of "I'm a really good person, and you're not." According to Philip Bump of The Washington Post, Carlson presents his perceived opponents "as endlessly cynical and duplicitous", and agitates his audience against them by cherry-picking and misinterpreting information. Charlotte Alter of Time wrote that Carlson "sanitizes and legitimizes right-wing conspiratorial thinking, dodges when you try to nail him down on the specifics, then wraps it all in an argument about censorship and free speech". Elaina Plott in The Atlantic summed up Carlson's style as "a gleeful fuck you" to his opponents.

During remote interviews, Carlson's producers will keep his face close-up onscreen so viewers can watch him react, often in disbelief. His trademark scowl lets viewers "share his disdain" toward opposing views, foreshadowing a "scathing rebuttal". Carlson is known to interrupt guests repeatedly with direct demands to answer questions he poses, sometimes focusing on an embarrassing episode or statement from a guest's past. Jack Shafer wrote in Politico that "When the host barks questions in your earpiece, you can't help but jolt to life like a puppet on a string", suggesting that successful guests on Carlson's show must match his quick-wittedness and unflappability. Lyz Lenz of the Columbia Journalism Review wrote that this debate maneuver mirrors Jon Stewart's confrontation of Carlson on Crossfire in 2004, describing Stewart then and Carlson now as both "com[ing] out of the gate with an impossible line of questioning and a disingenuous defense".

Charlotte Alter of Time wrote in July 2021 that Carlson sometimes tells "outright falsehoods", but generally "avoids assertions that are factually disprovable, instead sticking to innuendo". As an example, Alter wrote that Carlson did not endorse Sidney Powell's specific claims of voter fraud in the 2020 election, but he did say, "The people now telling us to stop asking questions about voting machines are the same ones who claim that our phones weren't listening to us". In September 2020, on The Rubin Report, Carlson said that, unlike TV newscasters who he said "systematically lie", he will only lie "if I'm really cornered or something", saying, "I lie. I really try not to. I try never to lie on TV. ... I don't like lying. I certainly do it, you know, out of weakness or whatever." Bump argued in 2022 that compared with other television anchors, Carlson is loath to acknowledge factual errors in his commentary.

Carlson's use of hyperbole as a rhetorical device was cited by Fox News in its successful defense in 2020 of a slander lawsuit by Karen McDougal, after Carlson incorrectly argued in 2018 that Donald Trump had been a victim of extortion by McDougal.

== Reception ==
Carlson is generally viewed as one of the leading voices in the right-wing media. According to the Encyclopædia Britannica, Carlson has been "recognized for his success in helping to bring far-right viewpoints and vocabulary into the mainstream of American politics" through his promotion of "extreme positions on a range of political and social issues, for his embrace of white nationalism, for his support of authoritarian leaders of other countries, and for his regular reliance on arguably false or misleading claims, including baseless conspiracy theories" and for "exert[ing] an unusual influence on Republican president Donald Trump, who was a regular viewer of Carlson's show." In 2021, Time said that Carlson could be the most powerful conservative in America, with Republican strategist Jeff Roe adding, "He doesn't react to the agenda, he drives the agenda." Mediaite named Carlson the most influential person in news media in 2021.

Tina Brown, the former editor of Vanity Fair and a former colleague of Carlson, said: "Tucker is a tremendously good writer and I always thought it was a real shame that he kind of got sucked into this TV mania thing."

On February 23, 2017, The Atlantic wrote that "Carlson's true talent is not for political philosophizing, it's for televised partisan combat. His go-to weapons—the smirky sarcasm, the barbed comebacks, the vicious politeness—seem uniquely designed to drive his sparring partners nuts, frequently making for terrific television".

On September 19, 2017, journalist Stephen Rodrick wrote in a GQ profile of Carlson: "On his show, Carlson mocks and verbally body-slams those who disagree with him, a passel of easy marks such as Democratic politicians, well-meaning liberal activists, and young reporters. He shares with Donald Trump a deep reluctance to apologize for his mistakes, and he lobs insults that seem suspiciously like subconscious self-assessments: He loves to accuse his guests of 'preening', and he derides 'pomposity, smugness, and groupthink'."

In an interview for a 2021 Time profile of Carlson, a former NewsCorp executive, Alex Azam, described Carlson as having some impunity within Fox News, "because of the signal that touching him would send to the viewers that Fox never wants to lose". In 2021, he was included in the Time 100, Time's annual list of the 100 most influential people in the world.

In April 2022, The New York Times published a three-part 20,000-word investigative series on Carlson called "American Nationalist". The investigative series documents Carlson's rise to prominence and his rhetoric on immigration, race relations and the COVID-19 pandemic, describing Tucker Carlson Tonight as "what may be the most racist show in the history of cable news—and also, by some measures, the most successful." Carlson responded by saying that he has not read "American Nationalist" and does not plan to. He also denied allegations from the Times about obsessing over ratings, saying that "I've never read the ratings a single day in my life. I don't even know how. Ask anyone at Fox." He also said he had taken positions unpopular with his audience, stating, "Most of the big positions I've taken in the past five years—against the neocons, the vax and the war [in Ukraine]—have been very unpopular with our audience at first."

== Personal life ==
Carlson is married to Susan Thomson Carlson (née Andrews). They met at St. George's School, where she was the daughter of the school's headmaster and priest. They were married on August 10, 1991, in the school chapel. They have four children. His son Buckley worked as Deputy Press Secretary to Vice President JD Vance.

Carlson was baptized and continues to identify as an Episcopalian but has said he grew up with secular beliefs; he credits his wife for his religious faith. In 2013, Carlson said, "We still go to the Episcopal Church for all kinds of complicated reasons, but I truly despise the Episcopal Church in a lot of ways," citing his opposition to the church's support for same-sex marriage and abortion rights. He has said he stays in the Church because he "loves the liturgy" and "likes the people".

Carlson quit drinking alcohol in 2002. A few years earlier, he quit smoking cigarettes (a habit begun in eighth grade) and took up nicotine gum, which he "chews constantly", and nicotine pouches. He became a co-founder of nicotine pouch company ALP Supply Co. after publicly turning on the nicotine pouch brand Zyn. He is a Deadhead (a fan of the rock band Grateful Dead) and has attended more than fifty Dead concerts.

In 2011, a group of protesters gathered outside his house in Kent, Washington, D.C., to protest Carlson. In 2017, Carlson sold his home and purchased another nearby. In late 2018, protestors gathered in front of their home. In 2020, Carlson sold his home in Kent and bought a house on Gasparilla Island, on Florida's Gulf Coast, and in the summer of 2022, a second home next door.

They now also live part of the year in Maine near his "favorite place in the world", Bryant Pond, Woodstock, Maine.

In September 2022, Carlson spoke at the funeral of Hells Angels president Sonny Barger. Carlson said that he had been a fan of Barger since his college years, quoted Barger as saying "stay loyal, remain free, and always value honor", and added "I want to pay tribute to the man who spoke those words".

In 2024, Carlson shared with a documentary producer that he believes that he was mauled by a demon while he was in bed. The attack left him bleeding. A few days later he referred to nuclear technology as "demonic".

== See also ==
- Seven on 7, fictional TV series inspired by Carlson

== Published works ==
- Carlson, Tucker (2003). Politicians, Partisans, and Parasites: My Adventures in Cable News. New York: Warner Books. ISBN 978-0759508002.
- — (2018). Ship of Fools: How a Selfish Ruling Class Is Bringing America to the Brink of Revolution. New York: Simon & Schuster. ISBN 978-1501183669.
- — (2021). The Long Slide: Thirty Years in American Journalism. New York: Simon & Schuster. ISBN 978-1501183690.
