= Leather production =

Animal hide processing industry

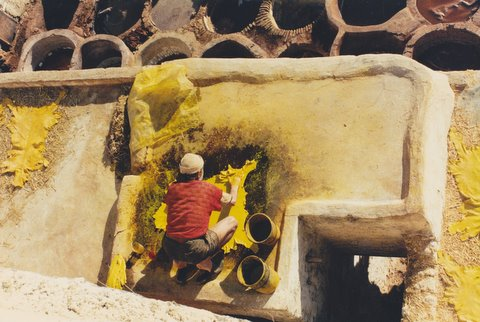
A tanning worker in Morocco.

The leather manufacturing process are the operations taken to create leather from hides. The procedure is divided into three sub-processes: preparatory stages, tanning, and crusting. All true leathers will undergo these sub-processes. A further sub-process, surface coating, may be added to the sequence. The list of operations that leathers undergo varies with the type of leather. There are environmental impacts associated with the process.

== Sub-processes ==
=== Preparatory stages ===
The preparatory stages are when the hide is prepared for tanning. During the preparatory stages, many of the unwanted raw skin components are removed. Many options for the pretreatment of the skin exist. Not all of the options may be performed. Preparatory stages may include:

- preservation- the hide is treated with a method which renders it temporarily imputrescible.
- soaking - water for purposes of washing or rehydration is reintroduced.
- liming - unwanted proteins and "opening up" is achieved.
- unhairing - the majority of hair is removed.
- fleshing - subcutaneous material is removed.
- splitting - the hide is cut into two or more horizontal layers.
- reliming - the hide is further treated to achieve more "opening up" or more protein removal.
- deliming - liming and unhairing chemicals are removed from the hide.
- bating - proteolytic proteins are introduced to the skin to remove further proteins and to assist with softening of the hide.
- degreasing - natural fats/oils are stripped or as much as is possible from the hide.
- frizing - physical removal of the fat layer inside the skin. Also similar to Slicking.
- bleaching - chemical modification of dark pigments to yield a lighter colored hide.
- pickling - lowering of the pH value to the acidic region. Must be done in the presence of salts. Pickling is normally done to help with the penetration of certain tanning agents, e.g., chromium (and other metals), aldehydic, and some polymeric tanning agents
- depickling - raising of the pH out of the acidic region to assist with penetration of certain tanning agents

=== Tanning ===
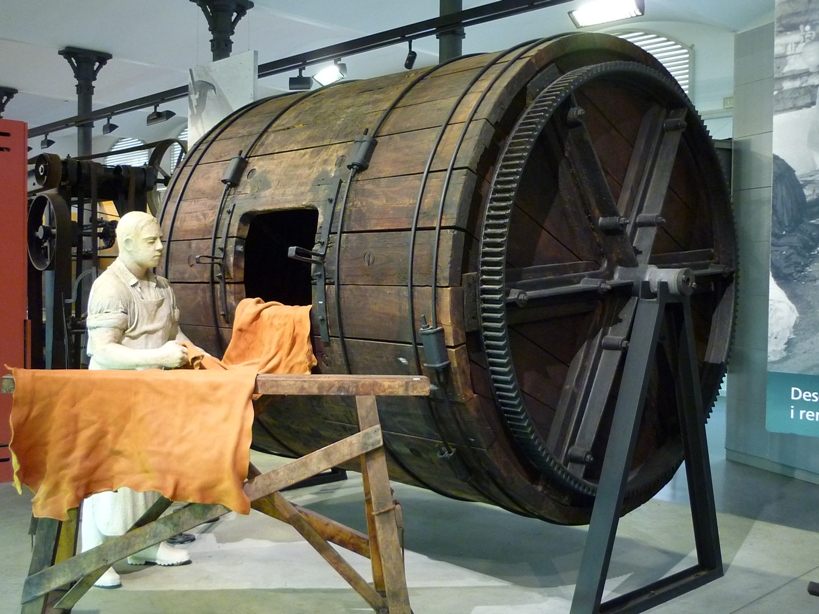
Barrel for leather tanning, Igualada Leather Museum, Spain

Tanning is the process that converts the protein of the raw hide or skin into a stable material which will not putrefy and is suitable for a wide variety of end applications. The principal difference between raw hides and tanned hides is that raw hides dry out to form a hard, inflexible material that can putrefy when re-wetted (wetted back), while tanned material dries out to a flexible form that does not become putrid when wetted back. A large number of different tanning methods and materials can be used; the choice is ultimately dependent on the end application of the leather. The most commonly used tanning material is chromium, which leaves the leather, once tanned, a pale blue colour. This product is commonly called “wet blue”.

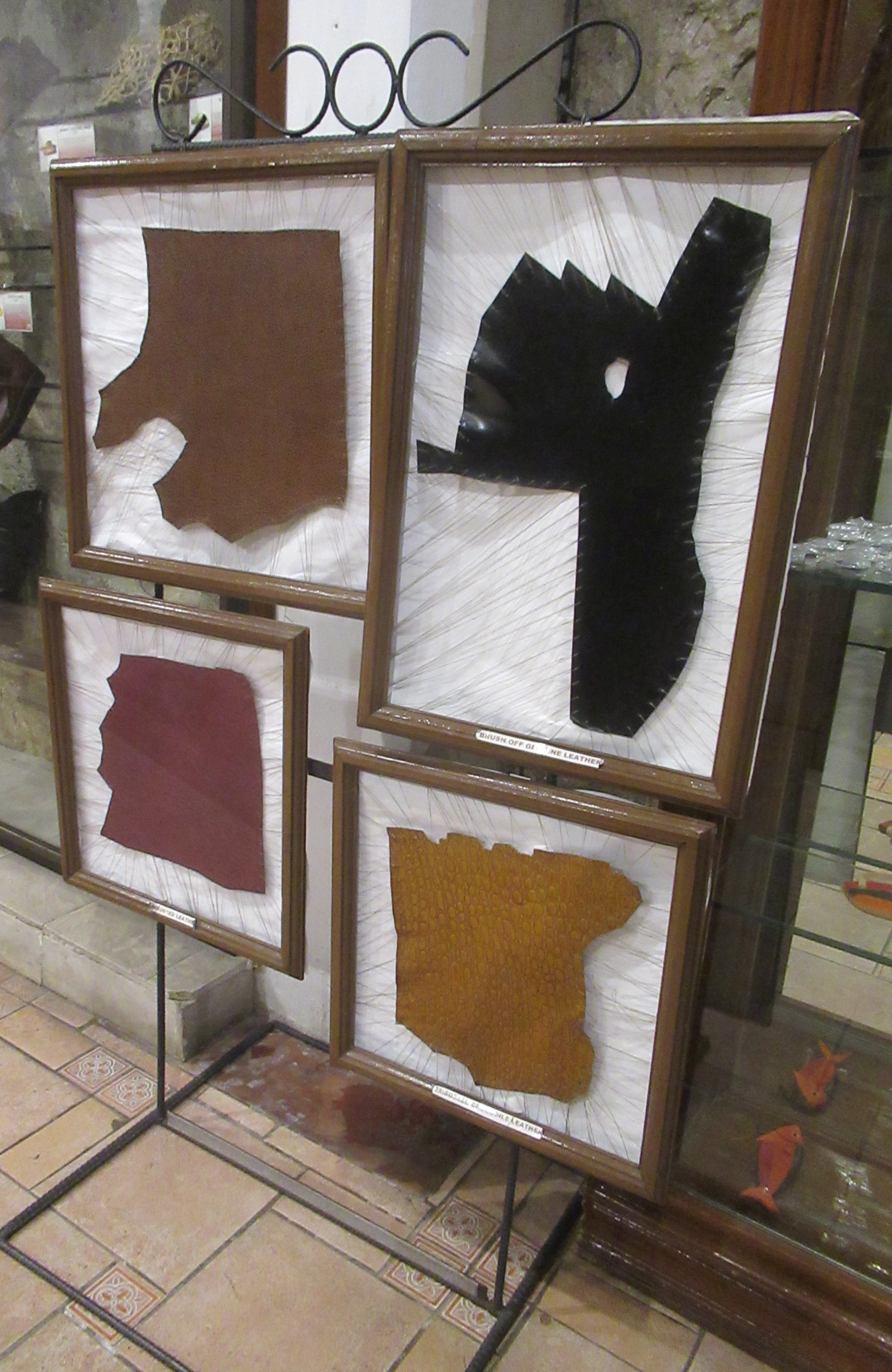
Meycauayan highest quality leather (Marikina Shoe Museum)

The acidity (pH) of hides once they have finished pickling will typically be between 2.8 and 3.2. At this point, the hides are loaded in a drum and immersed in a float containing the tanning liquor. The hides are allowed to soak (while the drum slowly rotates about its axle), and the tanning liquor slowly penetrates through the full substance of the hide. Regular checks will be made to see the penetration by cutting the cross-section of a hide and observing the degree of penetration. Once an even degree of penetration is observed, the pH of the float is slowly raised in a process called basification. This basification process fixes the tanning material to the leather, and the more tanning material fixed, the higher the hydrothermal stability and increased shrinkage temperature resistance of the leather. The pH of the leather when chrome tanned would typically finish somewhere between 3.8 and 4.2.

=== Crusting ===
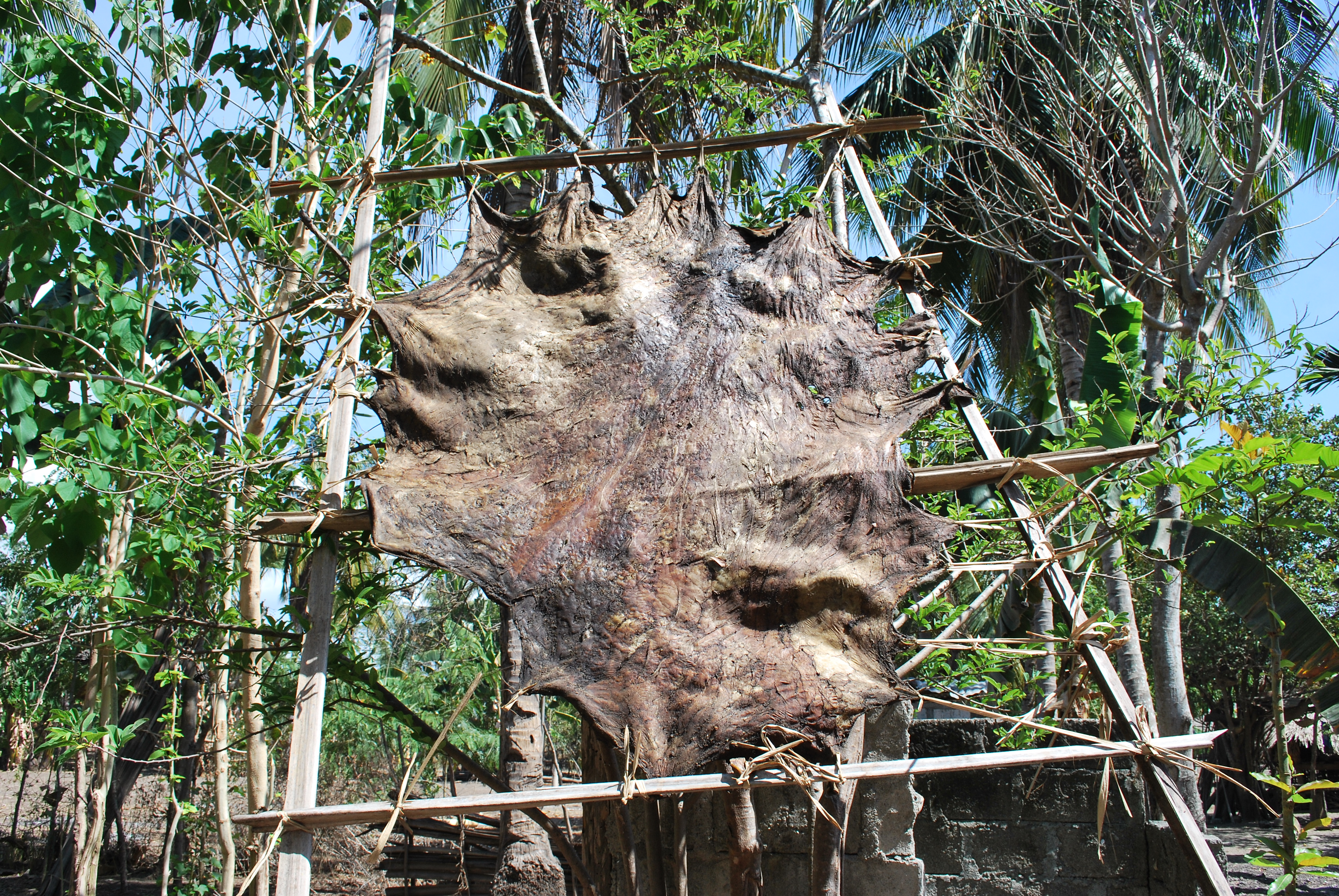
Drying of leather in East Timor

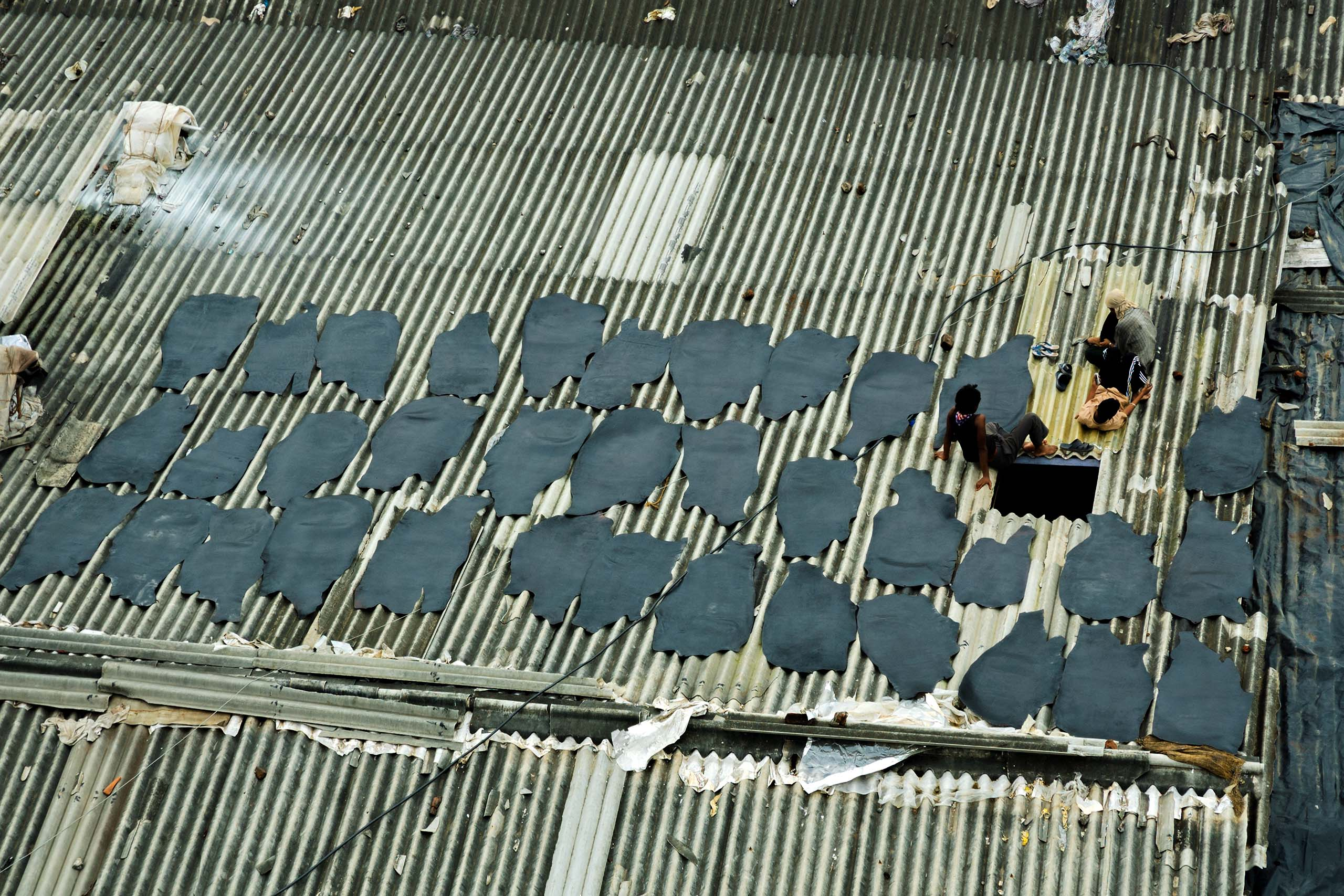
Leather production process - drying on the factory rooftop, Dharavi, India

Crusting is when the hide/skin is thinned, retanned and lubricated. Often, a coloring operation is included in the crusting sub-process. The chemicals added during crusting have to be fixed in place. The culmination of the crusting sub-process is the drying and softening operations. Crusting may include the following operations:

- wetting back- semi-processed leather is rehydrated.
- sammying - 45-55%(m/m) water is squeezed out the leather.
- splitting - the leather is split into one or more horizontal layers.
- shaving - the leather is thinned using a machine which cuts the leather fibres off.
- neutralisation - the pH of the leather is adjusted to a value between 4.5 and 6.5.
- retanning - additional tanning agents are added to impart properties.
- dyeing - the leather is coloured.
- fatliquoring - fats/oils and waxes are fixed to the leather fibres.
- filling - heavy/dense chemicals that make the leather harder and heavier are added.
- stuffing - fats/oils and waxes are added between the fibres.
- stripping - superficially fixed tannins are removed.
- whitening - the colour of the leather is lightened.
- fixation - all unbound chemicals are chemically bonded/trapped or removed from the leather
- setting - area, grain flatness are imparted and excess water removed.
- drying - the leather is dried to various moisture levels (commonly 14-25%).
- conditioning - water is added to the leather to a level of 18-28%.
- softening - physical softening of the leather by separating the leather fibres.
- buffing - abrasion of the surfaces of the leather to reduce nap or grain defects.

=== Surface coating ===
For some leathers, a surface coating is applied. Tanners refer to this as finishing. Finishing operations may include:

- oiling
- brushing
- padding
- impregnation
- buffing
- spraying
- roller coating
- curtain coating
- polishing
- plating
- embossing
- ironing
- combing (hair-on)
- glazing

== Production management ==
The leather-making process is, in general, restricted to batch processing, but if the surface coating sub-process is added, then some continuous processing can be included. The operation flow has to follow the preparatory → tanning → crusting → surface coating sub-process order without deviation, but some of the sub-processes can be omitted to make certain leathers (or partially tanned/ untanned products).

== Environmental impact ==
In addition to the other environmental impacts of leather, the production processes have a high environmental impact, most notably due to:

- the heavy use of polluting chemicals in the tanning process
- air pollution due to the transformation process (hydrogen sulfide during dehairing and ammonia during deliming, solvent vapours).

One tonne of hide or skin generally leads to the production of 20 to 80 m3 of turbid and foul-smelling wastewater, including chromium levels of 100–400 mg/L, sulfide levels of 200–800 mg/L and high levels of fat and other solid wastes, as well as notable pathogen contamination. Pesticides are also often added for hide conservation during transport. With solid wastes representing up to 70% of the wet weight of the original hides, the tanning process comes at a considerable strain on water treatment installations.

Tanning is especially polluting in countries where environmental norms are lax, such as in India - the world's 3rd largest producer and exporter of leather. To give an example of an efficient pollution prevention system, chromium loads per produced tonne are generally abated from 8 kg to 1.5 kg. VOC emissions are typically reduced from 30 kg/t to 2 kg/t in a properly managed facility. Very clearly, the process remains highly polluting all the same. A review of the total pollution load decrease achievable according to the United Nations Industrial Development Organization posts precise data on the abatement achievable through industrially proven low-waste advanced methods, while noting that « Even though the chrome pollution load can be decreased by 94% on introducing advanced technologies, the minimum residual load 0.15 kg/t raw hide can still cause difficulties when using landfills and composting sludge from wastewater treatment on account of the regulations currently in force in some countries. »

In Kanpur, the self-proclaimed "Leather City of the World" and a city of 3 million people on the banks of the river Ganges, pollution levels were so high that, despite an industry crisis, the pollution control board has decided to seal 49 high-polluting tanneries out of 404 in July 2009. In 2003 for instance, the main tannery's effluent disposal unit was dumping 22 tonnes of chromium-laden solid waste per day in the open.

The higher cost associated to the treatment of effluents as compared to untreated effluent discharging leads to environmental dumping to reduce costs. For instance, in Croatia in 2001, proper pollution abatement cost 70-100 USD/t of raw hides processed against US$43/t for irresponsible behaviour.

No general study seems to exist, but the current news is rife with documented examples of untreated effluent discharge. In November 2009 for instance, it was discovered that one of Uganda's main leather producing companies directly dumped its waste water in a wetland adjacent to Lake Victoria.

Nevertheless, several researchers have developed cleaner leather processing methodologies to reduce the environmental impact of conventional leather processing and to lower the burden of end-of-pipe treatment. They include salt-free preservation systems, enzyme-assisted low-sulfide hair removal processes, enzymatic fiber opening, ammonia-free deliming systems, pickle-free chrome tanning process, waterless chrome tanning technology, chrome-free tanning methods, formaldehyde-free syntans and solvent-free finishing systems. Some of these processes have found commercial acceptance.

== By country ==
- Leather industry in Bangladesh
- Leather industry in China
- Leather industry in Iran
