= Tannery of the Year =

Awards program for the tanning industry

Tannery of the Year is an awards programme for the global tanning industry, launched in 2009 to celebrate the production of leather and to help promote the material’s use throughout the world in footwear, furniture, car and aeroplane interiors, handbags and other accessories, gloves, and other applications.

== Background ==
The creation of the awards represented a response to the call from the International Leather Forum, an industry gathering that took place in Paris in September 2007. The award was suggested by World Trades Publishing, a business-to-business publishing company based in Liverpool, United Kingdom, which publishes a leather industry trade magazine called World Leather.

With the focus on corporate social responsibility, the Tannery of the Year programme will identify the two best tanneries in China, the rest of Asia, the Americas, Africa, and Europe.

World Leather magazine runs Tannery of the Year with backing from the APLF exhibition, chemical manufacturers BASF, Buckman and Lanxess, the International Council of Tanners, the International Union of Leather Technologists and Chemists Societies and the United Nations Industrial Development Organisation.

== Recipients ==
Year	Global recipients	Regional recipients	Notes
2009	Ethiopia Tannery Share Company	Africa—Ethiopia Tannery Share Company.; Americas—Curtiembres Fonseca, Argentina.; Asia excluding China—PrimeAsia Vietnam.; China—Simona Tanning.; Europe—Bridge of Weir Leather Company, Scotland.	
2011	Germany Heller-Leder	Africa - Nakara, Namibia.; Americas - Coming Indústria e Comércio de Couros, Brazil.; Asia excluding China - TehChang Leather Products Co Ltd, Taiwan.; China - Xing Ye Leather Technology Company, Fujian Province.; Europe - Heller-Leder, Germany.	
2013	China PrimeAsia	Africa - Seton AutoLeather, South Africa.; Americas - SB Foot, Red Wing, Minnesota, US.; Asia excluding China - Midori Hokuyo, Japan.; China - PrimeAsia China.; Europe - Sepici Grubu, Turkey.	UNIDO was part of the jury
2014	Austria Wollsdorf Leather	Africa - Dire Tannery, Ethiopia.; Americas - Bojos Tanning, the Dominican Republic.; Asia excluding China - Saigon Tan Tec, Vietnam.; China - Mingxin Leather, Zhejiang Province.; Europe - Wollsdorf Leather, Austria.	
2018	USA Mississippi TanTec		
