= Tanwater =

Special water treatment project

Tanwater was a special water treatment project initiated by Elmo tannery in Sweden in 1992. It aimed to reduce nitrogen in effluent during the tanning of leather. The tannery received a grant for the project from LIFE (The Financial Instrument for the Environment).

== Description ==
Tanwater was a special water treatment project. It was initiated in 1992 by Elmo tannery. The initiative's aim was to reduce nitrogen effluent from the water treatment systems during the tanning of leather. Previously, tanneries in Europe had only been able to reduce nitrogen in the water by up to a maximum of 30%; the Tanwater project aimed at reducing nitrogen waste by up to 80%. The project was able to achieve 89% nitrogen-waste reduction in the water. This was a major breakthrough for the tanning industry, because nitrogen is a pollutant of ground water.

== History ==
Elmo tannery received a grant for the project from LIFE (The Financial Instrument for the Environment). LIFE finances environmental projects in the European Union. Elmo tannery, although producing leather predominantly for the car industry (upholstery leather), also produces leather for handbags and footwear. Since Elmo started this project, there have been a number of tanneries that have followed in its steps of improving their water treatment systems in Sweden and Norway.
