= Degreasing =

Removal of fatty acids from an object

Degreasing, often called defatting or fat trimming, is the removal of fatty acids from an object. In culinary science, degreasing is done with the intention of reducing the fat content of a meal.

== Degreasing food ==
Degreasing is often used by dieters, particularly those following low-fat diets to reduce their fat consumption to induce weight loss. The energy content of 1 g of fat is 9 calories, while that of carbohydrates and proteins is 4 calories. Hence, dieters often view decreasing fat consumption as an efficient way of losing weight without greatly sacrificing total volume of food. Degreasing during meal preparation is used to reduce the energy content of the food being prepared.

Those people who wish to reduce their cholesterol level or fat intake, in particular people with hypercholesterolemia often use degreasing to reduce their fat consumption.

=== Degreasing of a meal during preparation ===
Fat trimming of a meal can be done during preparation by a variety of methods. The most common methods involving substituting food items or removal of naturally occurring fat and conservative addition of fat.

Substituting fats is a method in which a certain ingredient is substituted by another ingredient. A common way of doing this is substituting saturated fatty acids with unsaturated fatty acids while cooking. For instance, olive oil can be used instead of butter for seasoning vegetables.

Food items are also substituted to reduce fat content. For instance, instead of using eggs by using a whole egg, where the egg yolks are high in fat levels, egg whites can instead be used. Alternatively, skimmed milk or similar low-fat products can be used as ingredients for cooking.

=== Degreasing liquids ===
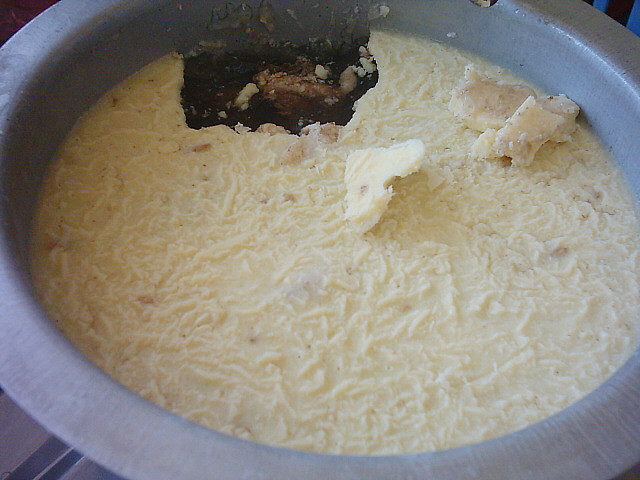
(Frozen soup with a layer of fat shown above) Cooling provides an easy way to degrease food as the fat rises to the surface and solidifies fully.

Many different foods can be degreased after preparation. Liquid foods that are high in fat, such as braising liquids, roasting juices and broths may have floating oil on top throughout and after the cooking process. Fat can be skimmed off the liquid with a small ladle, spoon, or cup as the liquid simmers and then discarded. This is done by placing the saucepan with only half of it on the heat source so that the liquid simmers only on one side. This pushes the fat to the opposite side and makes it easier to lift off with the ladle. The fat can then be skimmed off by holding the ladle so that the top of its bowl is almost level with the liquid and then tilting it slightly and in a circular motion toward the edge of the saucepan where the fat accumulates.

As braising liquids and broths simmer, they typically throw off more fat and protein and sometimes froth, so it is easier to wait at least a few minutes until the liquid has cooled before degreasing. In making slowly reduced liquids it may be ideal to wait for it to cool even longer.

As an alternative to a ladle, a degreasing cup can be used to skim the fat off hot liquids. This is a clear plastic or glass cup that looks similar to a teapot, with a spout that comes out of the bottom. The liquid and juices are poured into the cup then poured out leaving the fat behind; the liquid comes from the bottom of the cup instead of the top. Degreasing cups come in various sizes.

Refrigerating or freezing liquids until the fat congeals and solidifies can make the fat easier to remove with a spoon. If, after removing the congealed fat, the liquid still appears cloudy, it can be made clearer by skimming it again with a ladle after bringing it to a gentle simmer to allow for the release of more fat and insoluble proteins.

=== Degreasing solid food items ===
Some items, such as roasted foods, and other cooked food items, such as pizza, can sometimes be oily and greasy. Degreasing them after preparation may provide a solution to this problem. Fried foods, such as French fries, can often be degreased without decreasing the crispiness of the food item by simply blotting out the oil in the food item with a tissue paper.

=== Commercial degreasing ===
Many food manufacturing companies such as Weight Watchers have been developed for people who wish to reduce their fat intake. The customer need of defatting has also led to the production of low fat products, e.g., low fat cheese.

== Degreasing in the tanning industry ==
Degreasing may also refer to the removal of excess fat and grease lodged within the fur pelts of bears, raccoons, beavers, possums and wolverines. In modern-day tanning operations, the removal of this grease is achieved by adding a liquid chemical agent, usually 2 fluid ounces (60 milliliters) to every 5 gallons (19 litres) of pickling solution. The chemical agent is sometimes known as a "relaxer," and where the hides are left to soak for 3 to 4 days. Detergent degreasing has also been used extensively in the tanning industry, but which has often had environmental impacts. In Turkey, degreasing of sheepskin with the wool intact is performed on hides after stretching the leather, when they are then inserted inside a large, revolving drum with beechwood sawdust and nepheline powder, for about 6 hours. Afterwards, the hides are dusted from the sawdust residue and stretched again.

Another simple method is to rub hot cornmeal or sawdust over the flesh-side of the animal pelt, followed by scraping. In modern tanning methods, the process of degreasing is usually performed after bating and drenching, and is then followed by pickling and tanning.

== Solvent degreasing ==
Solvent degreasing is a process used to prepare a part for further operations such as electroplating or painting. Typically it uses petroleum, chlorine, or alcohol based solvents to dissolve the machining fluids and other contaminants that might be on the part.
