= Leather industry in China =

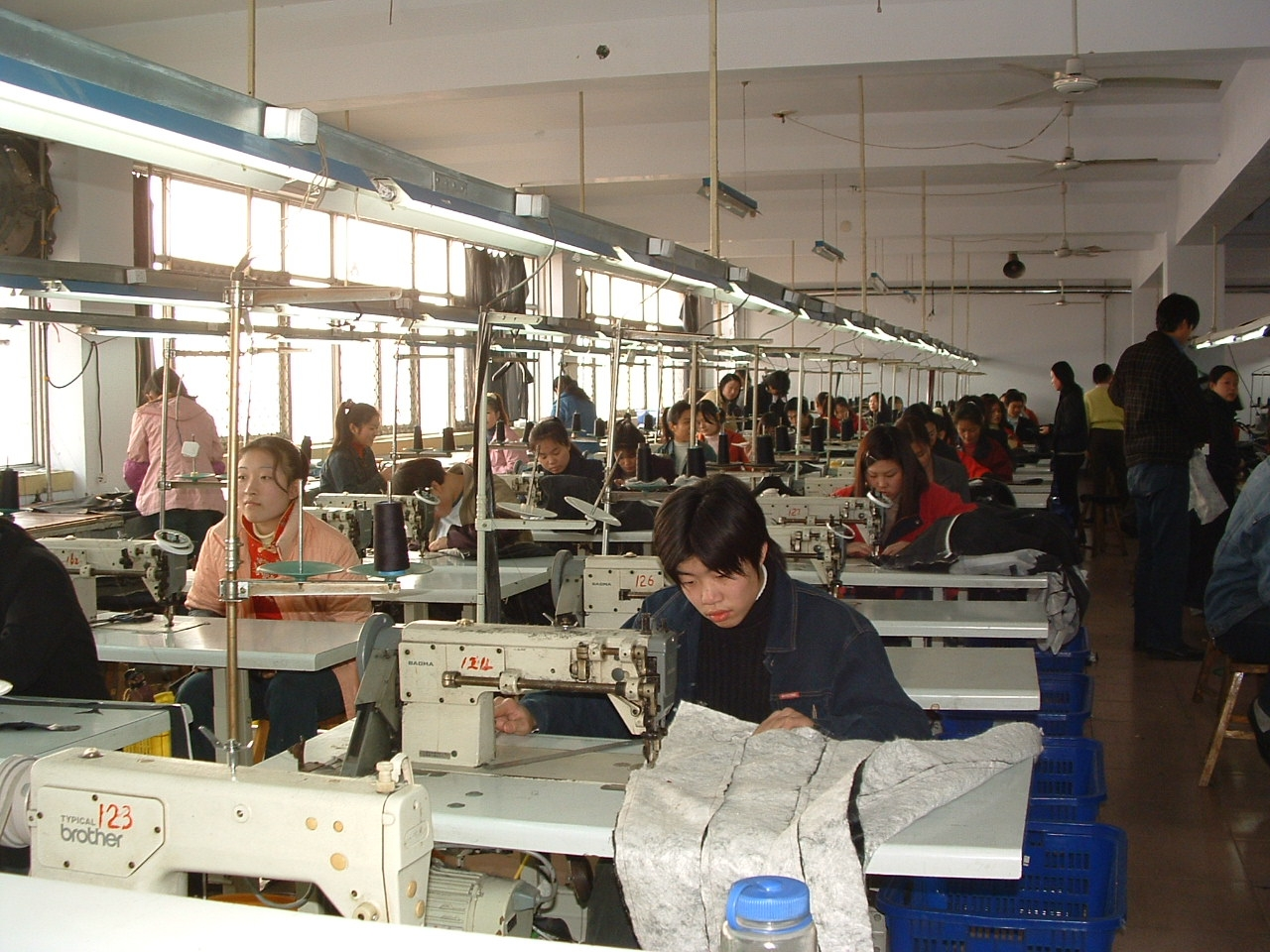
Factory workers at their sewing stations in Xinji, Hebei province.

The leather industry in China is a significant sector within the country's manufacturing and export economy, recognized as the world's largest producer of leather by volume. It encompasses the production of leather goods, including garments, footwear, and accessories, with major industrial clusters in regions such as Guangdong, Zhejiang, and Hebei provinces. The industry grew substantially since the 1980s, driven by economic reforms, low labor costs, and abundant raw materials.

== History ==
Leather production in China has historical roots dating back over 3,000 years to the Shang Dynasty, when tanning was practiced in areas like Xinji, Hebei Province. However, modern industrial growth began in the early 1980s following China's economic reforms and opening-up policies. Small workshops, often established by former state-owned tannery workers, emerged to process sheepskins and other hides, primarily for local markets.

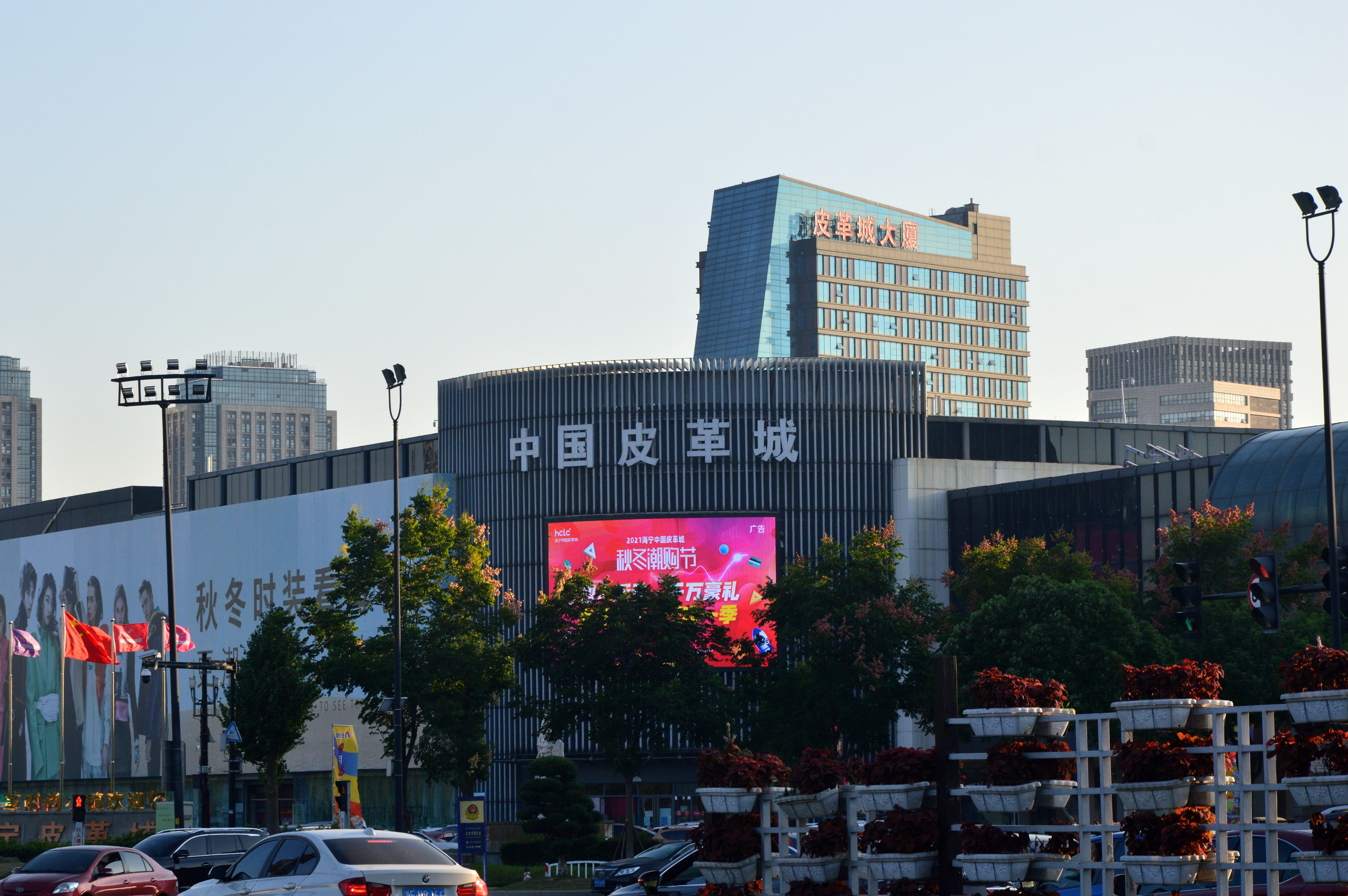
Haining Leather City Block A (Leather, Fur, and Luggage Trading Area)

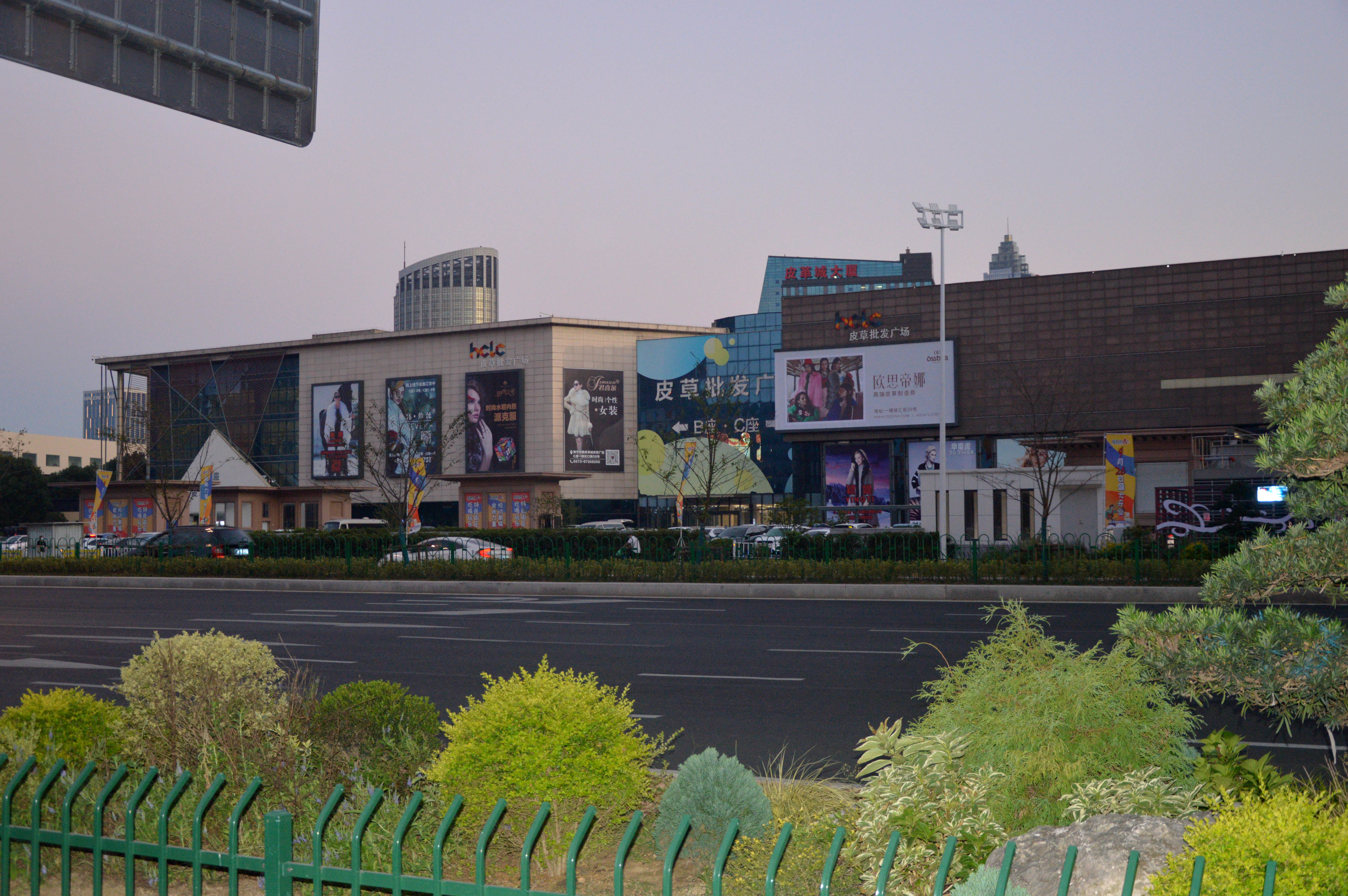
Block B, Block C (Leather and Shoes Plaza, Fur Plaza)

The 1990s marked a period of rapid growth, fueled by foreign investment, advanced tanning technologies, and export-oriented policies. Industrial clusters, such as Xinji City in Hebei and Haining Leather City in Zhejiang, became key production hubs. By 2001, Xinji alone produced 15% of the world’s sheepskin garment leather, with an output value of US$600 million, of which US$250 million was from exports.

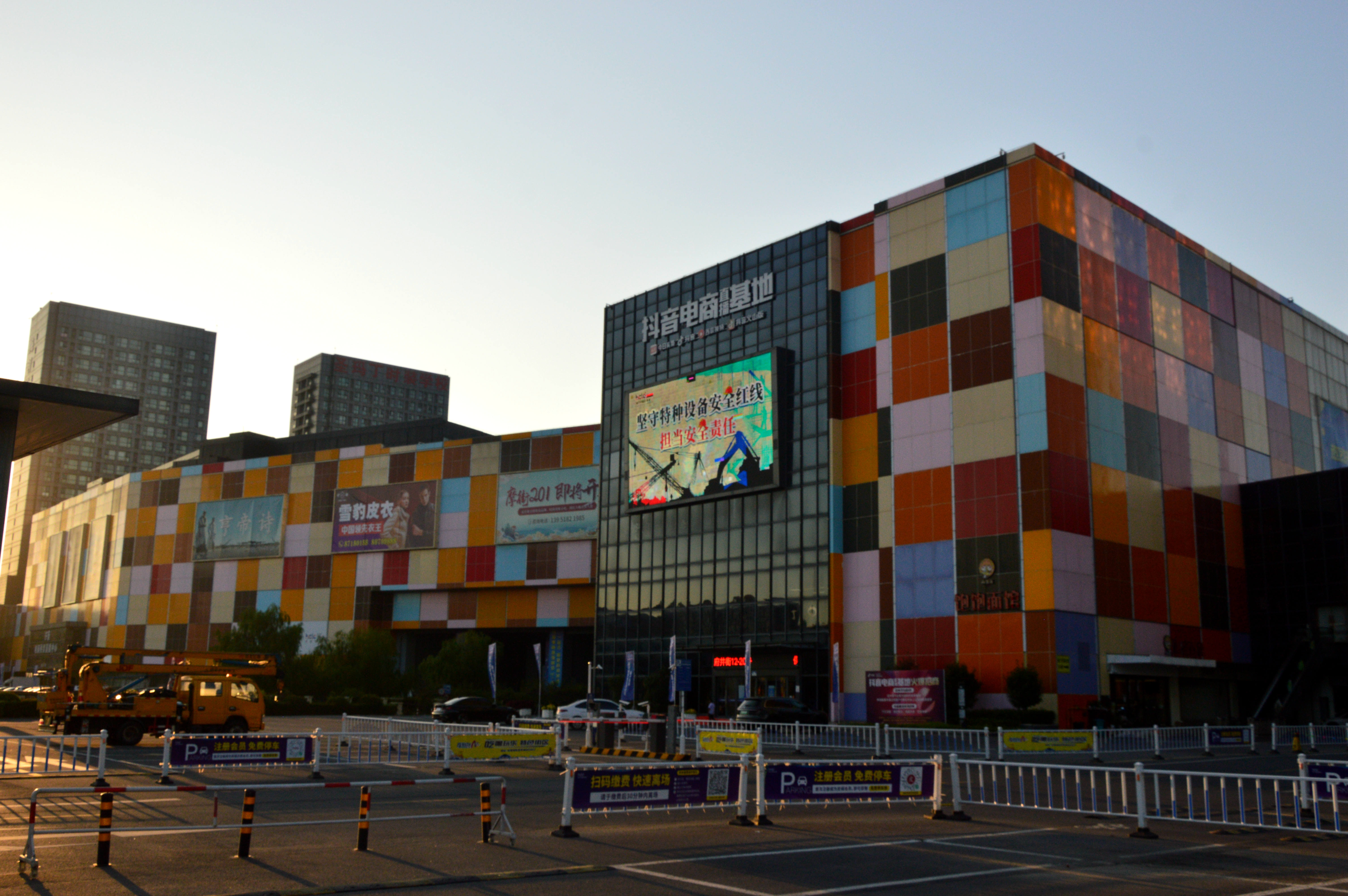
Blocks E and F (Women's Wear Hall, Brand Flagship Store Plaza)

By the 2000s, China solidified its position as the global leader in leather production and exports. In 2009, the leather industry’s export value reached over US$56 billion, driven by footwear (67% of global shoe production) and leather goods (36% of global exports). The industry saw further consolidation, with tanning clusters in Hebei undergoing restructuring to improve efficiency and environmental performance. By 2012, China’s leather exports reached US$75 billion, surpassing competitors like Italy and Vietnam.

== Production and export ==
=== Major production centers ===
China’s leather industry is concentrated in several regions:

- Xinji, Hebei Province
- Shiling, Guangzhou, Guangdong Province
- Haining, Zhejiang Province
- Other notable regions include Wenzhou (leather shoes), Jinjiang (sneakers), and Chengdu (leather shoes).

=== Export markets ===
China exports leather goods to over 130 countries, with key markets including Russia, the United States, Germany, Japan, and Eastern Europe. In 2000, China’s leather and footwear exports totaled US$17.47 billion, the highest globally. Russia is a major destination for sheepskin garment leather. Exports are facilitated through direct channels and intermediaries in Hong Kong and South Korea, with products ranging from fur coats to footwear and accessories.

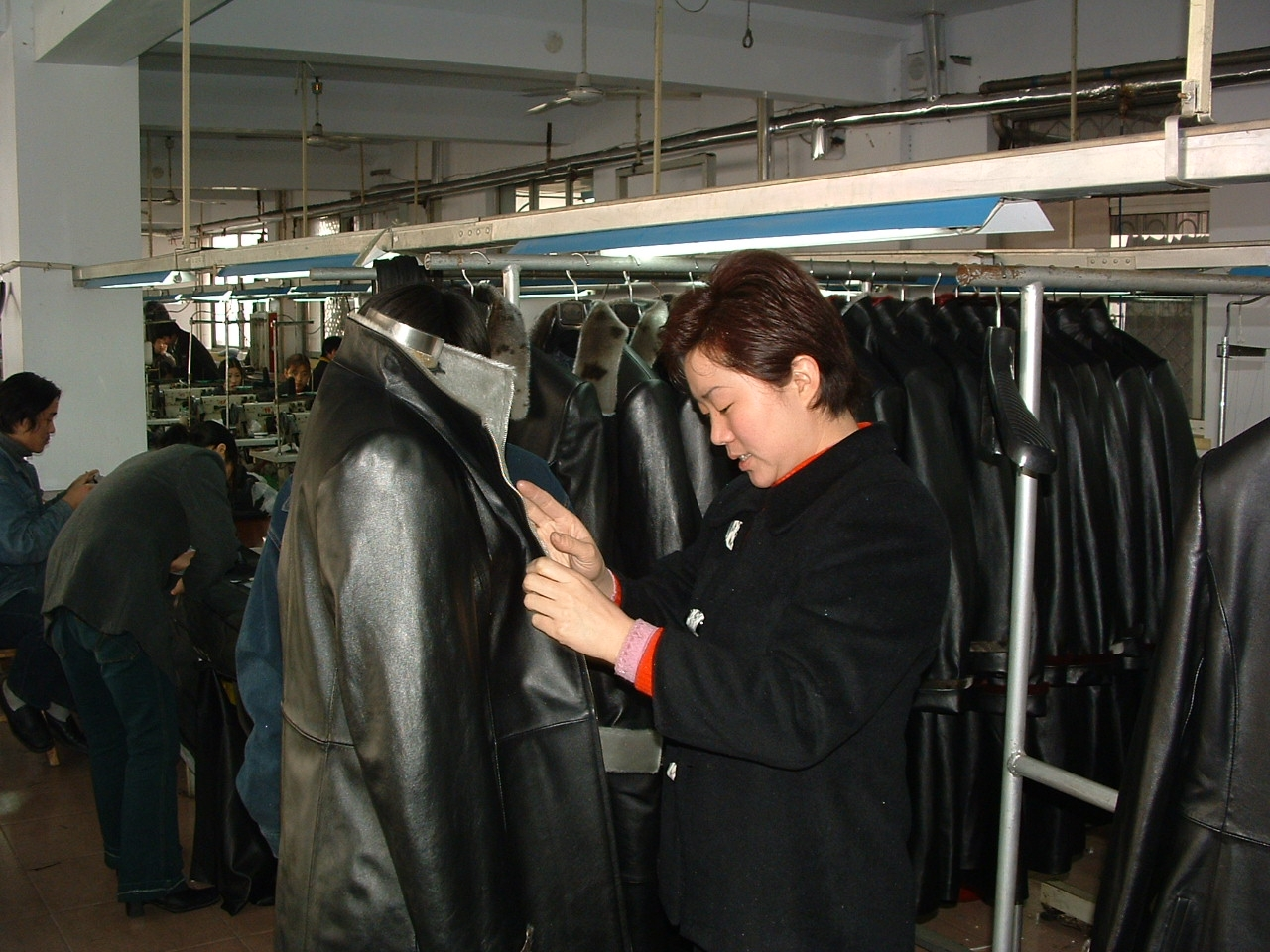
A worker inspects a finished leather coat on a rack in a garment factory in Hebei province.

In 2021, China held the position of the world's leading exporter of leather goods, accounting for 29% of global exports.

== Environmental impact ==
The leather industry has faced criticism for its environmental footprint, particularly due to wastewater from tanning processes. In 2009, the industry discharged over 249 million cubic meters of wastewater, making it one of China’s top 20 water polluters. Tannery effluents often contain toxic heavy metals, chromium, and high levels of Chemical Oxygen Demand (COD) and Biological Oxygen Demand (BOD).

Historically, small manufacturers prioritized cost over environmental compliance, leading to widespread pollution. The industry’s reliance on chromium tanning (used in 80% of global leather production) exacerbates water and soil pollution. In some places wastewater was found to contain hexavalent chromium, a carcinogen, found in soil several times above government standards.
