= Shiling, Guangzhou =

Shiling 狮岭镇
- Town
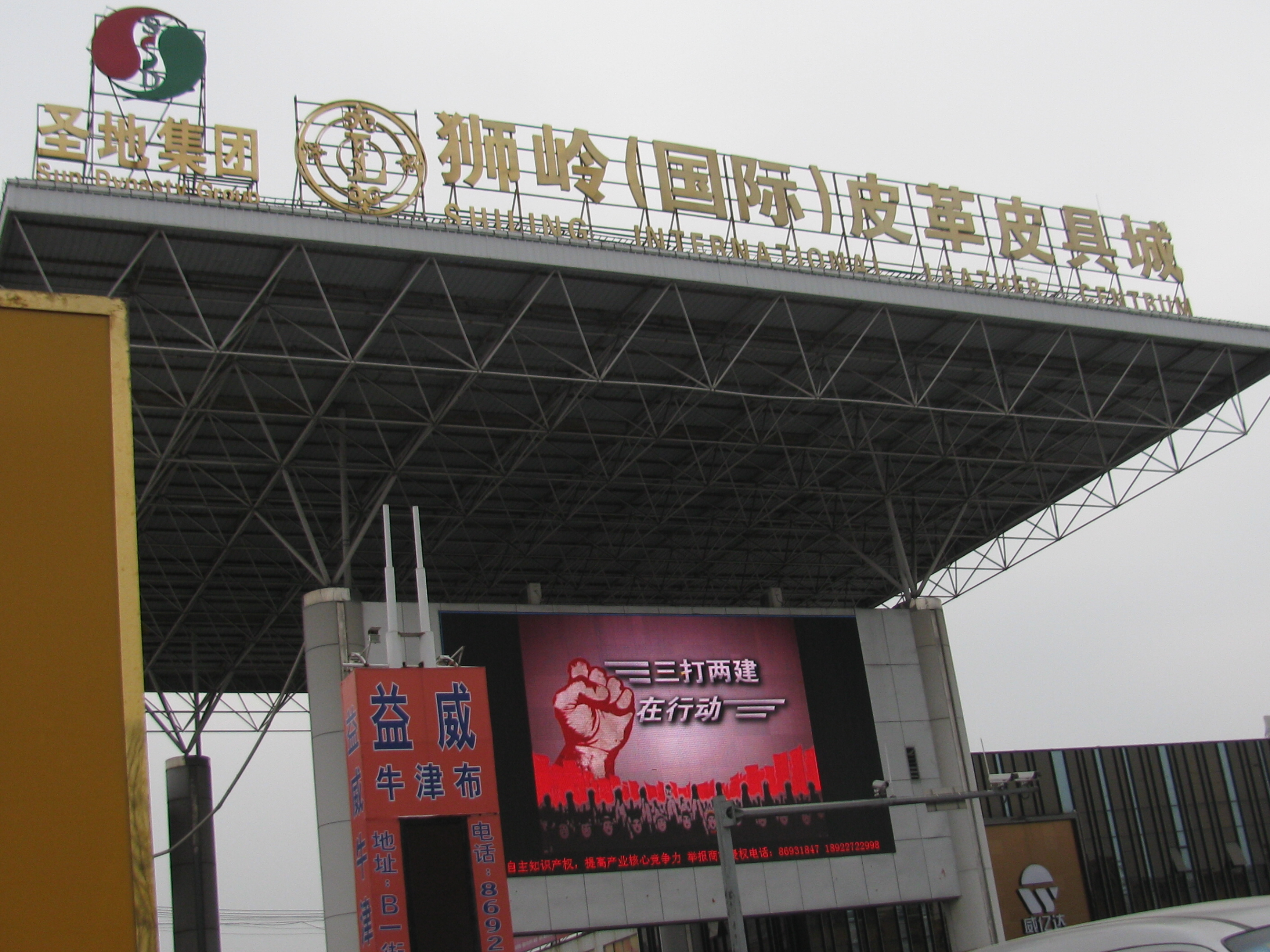

- Location in Guangdong
- Coordinates (Shiling town government): 23°27′39″N 113°09′05″E
- Country: People's Republic of China
- Province: Guangdong
- Sub-provincial city: Guangzhou
- District: Huadu

Area
  - Total: 136.31 km^{2} (52.63 sq mi)

Population (2017)
  - Total: 300,000
- Time zone: UTC+8 (China Standard)

Shiling (simplified Chinese: 狮岭镇; traditional Chinese: 獅嶺鎮; pinyin: Shīlǐng Zhèn) is a town in Huadu District, Guangzhou. In the 1970s the government began centrally planned industrialization of Shiling as a leatherworking town. The town is now a major center for the leatherworking industry in China. The town spans an area of 136.31 square kilometres (52.63 sq mi), and is home to 300,000 residents.

== Etymology ==
Its name means "Lion Ridge", so called because of the local mountain ridge that is shaped like a lion. Shiling Town has long consisted of small farms abutting the mountains from which it gets its name.

== Geography ==
Shiling Town is located in Huadu District, a district of Guangzhou. Shiling is 34 kilometres (21 mi) from downtown Guangzhou.

=== Administrative districts ===
Shiling is divided into three neighborhood committees and seventeen village committees.

== History ==
Archeological records indicate that the area around present-day Shiling was engaged in worship of the Chinese deity Pangu as far back as 500 CE.

Shiling was founded as a hamlet (圩) in the Qing dynasty some time during the reign of the Qianlong Emperor (1736–1795).

Hong Xiuquan, leader of the Taiping Rebellion, developed his revolutionary theory and wrote many of his famous works while staying in Shiling (c. 1845 - 1847) at the Yuan Floral Hall (袁氏花厅), the ruins of which are still visible.

Shiling was reorganized into a commune (公社) in 1953, into a region (区) in 1983, and most recently into a town (镇) in 1986.

== Demographics ==
As of 2017, the town reported a resident population of 300,000 people, of which, 58,000 were registered residents under the hukou system. A 2018 government public the town's hukou population at 64,355.

== Economy ==
In 2017, the town achieved a total GDP of 10.759 billion Yuan, a 7.5% from the previous year. The town's primary sector makes up 3.5% of Shiling's GDP, the secondary sector makes up 61.0%, and the tertiary sector makes up 35.5% of the GDP.

=== Farming ===
Shiling was originally and remains an agricultural community. Primary produce are rice, fruits, vegetables, flowers, nursery stock and the breeding of poultry and fish.

=== Leather industry ===
Leather production in Shiling began in the 1970s, when the central government promoted industrial development of Shiling focused on the leatherworking industry, by encouraging farmers to integrate leather production into their lifestyle. Prior to the 2000s, Shiling primarily produced low and medium quality leather goods for Chinese markets. Beginning in the year 2000, the city began hosting the Shiling Leather and Leather Goods Festival (狮岭皮革皮具节), a trade fair for the leather industry. During the late 2000s, the local government made a concerted effort with local businesses to increase the quality of the town's leather goods, and to internationalize the city's industry. Part of this effort included the creation of a post-doctoral research institute devoted to leather research, and a design institute meant to train people to become leather workers and leather designers.

Shiling's leather industry now comprises 8,000 enterprises producing leather, employing approximately 300,000 employees. Over 2,600 brands manufacture their leather goods in Shiling, including Guess, Coach, and Walmart.

The Shiling leather industry was worth 4.7 billion yuan in 2002 and 9 billion in 2009.

=== Suburban real estate development ===
During the 2000s, the town experienced significant development along the G94 Pearl River Delta Ring Expressway. The real estate developments in Shiling have been advertised as a "golden corridor" (黄金走廊) and "tomorrow's satellite city" (明日卫星城).

=== Tourism ===
Despite its reputation as an industrial center, the local government has made an effort to promote the town's tourism industry in the 21st century. The town's government has promoted local mountains and historical sites as destinations, while also hosting cultural festivals centered on local folk culture.

==== Pangu Temple ====
The northern part of Shiling hosts a temple dedicated to Pangu built in 1809, and rebuilt in 1901 after being burned. The temple was neglected for many years, renovated (1984–86) and reopened. The temple is promoted as a tourist attraction and pilgrimage site. The temple is noted for being the site of a large lion dance, waterfall, and clean spring water from Longkou spring, which is believed to have healing properties. A festival is held on the birthday of Pangu, the 12th day of the 10th month of the Chinese lunar calendar.

==== Mountain Resorts ====
Following the tourist draw of the Pangu temple, other resorts have been opened in the nearby mountain areas.

== Transportation ==
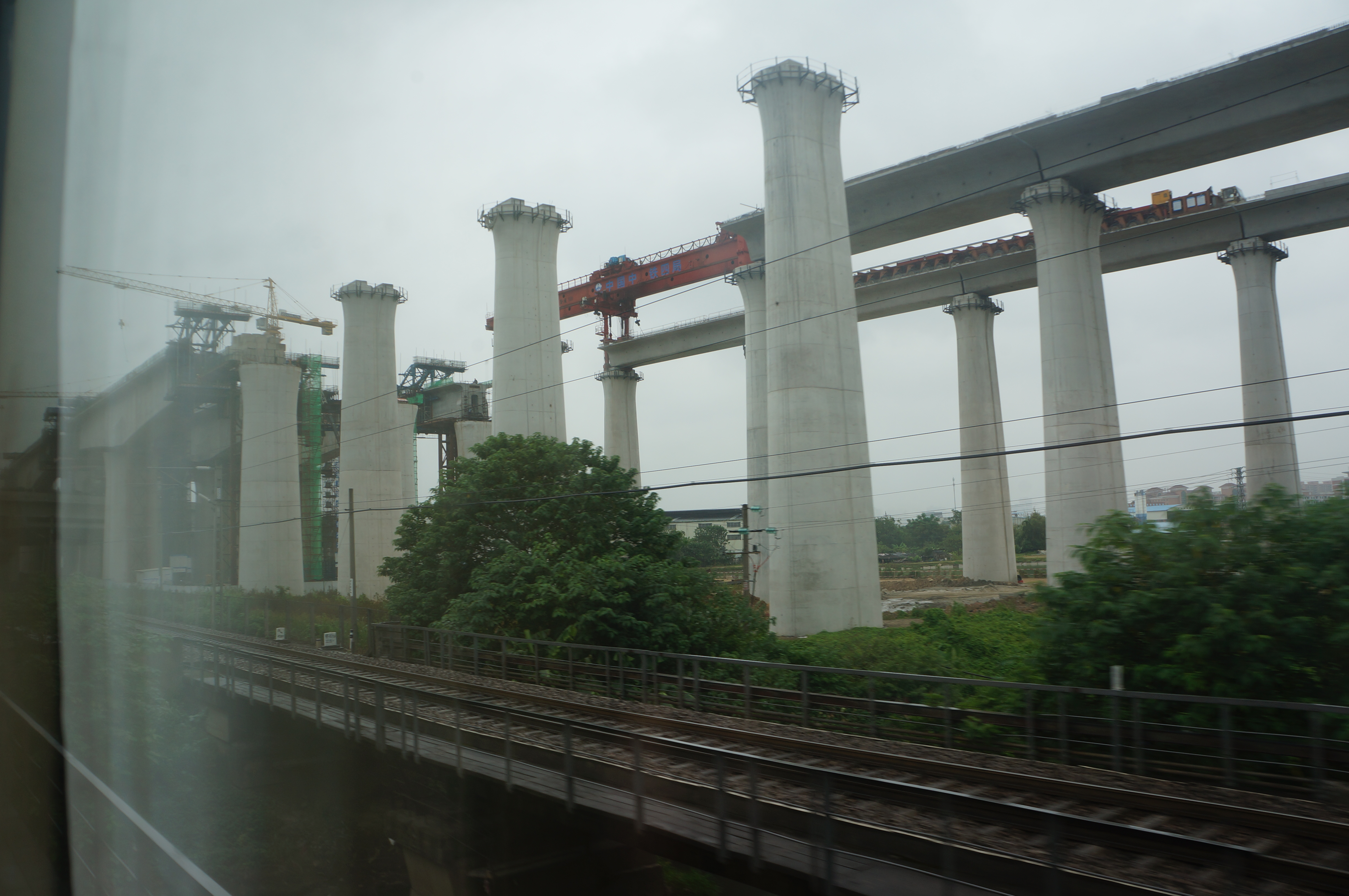
Guangzhou–Qingyuan Intercity Railway, under construction in 2016

Two major highways run through Shiling: the Guangqing Expressway and the Zhaohua Expressway. Three major railways run through Shiling: the Beijing-Guangzhou Railway, the Wuhan-Guangzhou Railway, and the Guangzhou-Qingyuan Railway.

== Notes and references ==
Leather Companies In China
