= Bating (leather) =

Former tanning industry process

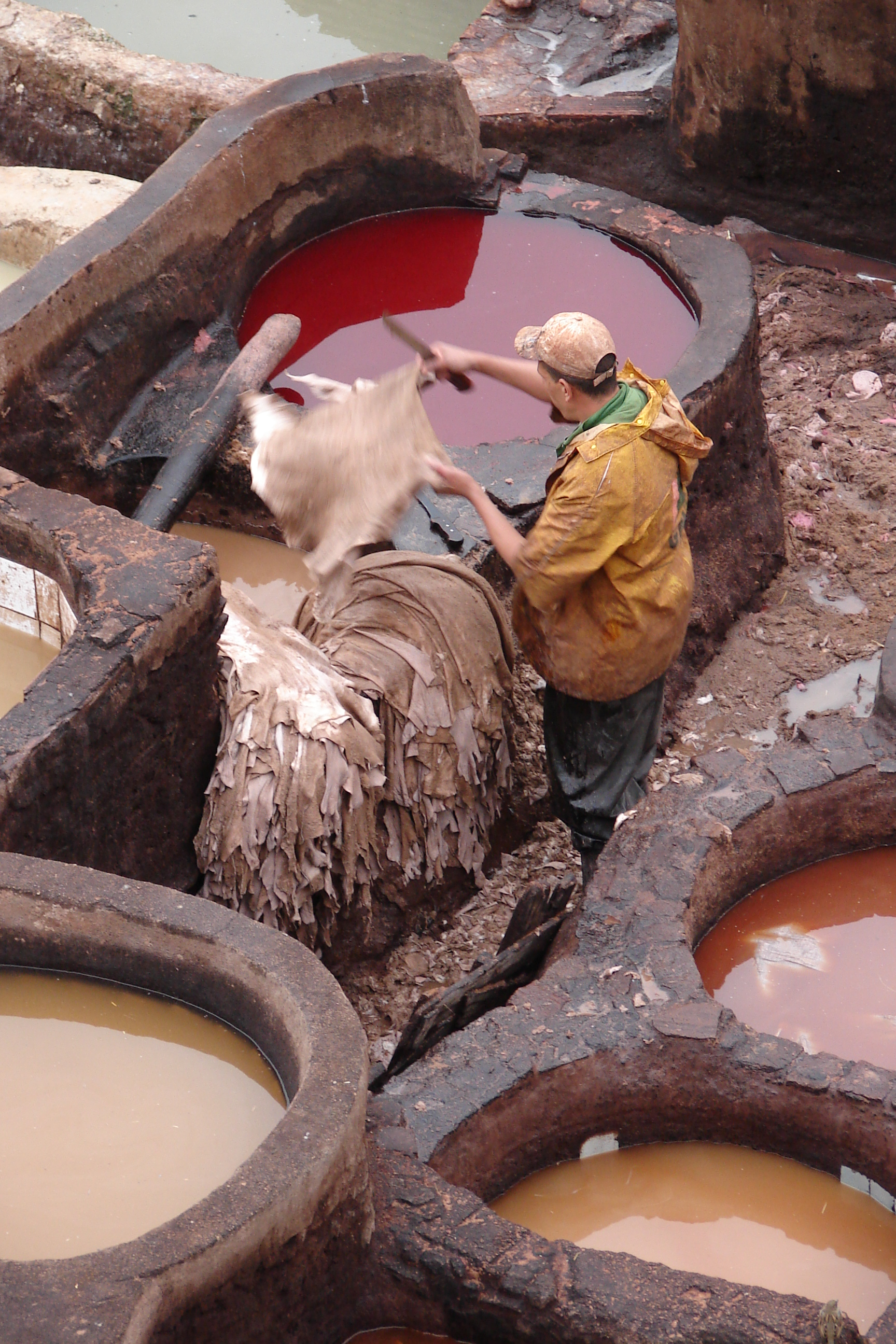
A tanner treating leather in Morocco

Bating is a technical term used in the tanning industry to denote leather that has been treated with hen or pigeon manure, similar to puering (see puer) where the leather has been treated with dog excrement, and which treatment, in both cases, was performed on the raw hide prior to tanning in order to render the skins, and the subsequent leather, soft and supple. Today, both practices are obsolete and have been replaced in the tanneries with other natural proteolytic enzymes.

== Leather processing ==
Since early times, tanners have made use of either dog fæces, or hen and pigeon manure, in one of the early phases of leather treatment to produce a soft leather. A bath solution containing the animal extracts was made and the raw hide inserted and left there for a few days, which activated the bacteria and enzymes that reacted with the collagen in the animal skin to make the leather soft and supple. This step was followed by drenching, a term denoting skins that were thoroughly washed in a bath solution of bran (usually of barley or rye), or ash bark. This process was thought to open up the fibre, and, if lime (CaO) was used to remove hair before the actual bating, drenching removed excess or residual lime trapped in the leather.

Early inventors who concerned themselves with tanning looked upon bating as a process for removing lime from the skins, and nothing more, and since the use of animal fæces was repulsive, sought to substitute them by inventing artificial bates. What they failed to realize, however, was that bating also acts upon the skin fibres, rendering portions of the skins soluble, bringing about the finished condition. One of the early inventions made to replicate bating was the chemical use of old lime liquors (with high levels of ammonia) neutralized with sulphuric acid. This method more nearly approximates to the conditions of the dung.

=== Experimentation and research ===
Puering fell into disuse after Robert Hasenclever began producing the enzyme pancreatin on an industrial scale between 1895 and 1897. By 1907, it was used by Otto Röhm in the tannery. J.T. Wood, investigating the microbial properties of dog fæces, was able to isolate species of different bacteria, determining that aged dog fæces was more potent (hence, more efficacious) than fresh dog fæces. The bacteria that settles on the excrement releases, under right conditions, the principal enzyme trypsin.

== Natural bates ==
Primitive tanning methods differed from country to country, but the use of puering and bating was not prevalent in all of them, as tanners had moved away from their use and employed vegetable tanning which achieved nearly the same result. In western societies, modern tanning techniques tried to replicate the effect of puering and bating by using a natural bate. Papain, the active proteolytic enzyme found in the latex taken from the skin of the papaya fruit (Carica papaya), is thought to replicate the action of traditional puering and bating. The protein-digesting enzyme is now used extensively in the leather industry, and follows the dehairing of the animal skin, usually with lime and other proteolytic enzymes, and the deliming of the animal hide with mineral acid. This process is thought to release traces of lime still trapped in the hide after the deliming process, in addition to removing unwanted grease, besides aiding in the subsequent tanning process by the alteration of protein.

Today, in the modern tanning industry where almost all innovations have been made by substituting vegetable tanning agents with chemical agents, bating is the only step in leather processing where enzymatic process cannot be substituted by chemical processes, as the process of bating gives certain desired characteristics to the finished leather. Large-scale use of microbial enzymes, following the introduction of fermentation technology, has become standard in the tanning industry.

Enzymatic soaking of the raw hides has been shown to loosen the scud, initiate the opening of the fibre structure, and to render a leather product with less wrinkled grain when used at an alkaline pH of less than 10.5. In rabbit skins it improves the softness and elasticity, and increases the surface area yield of the fur by 3.3%. Bating also acts to hydrolyze casein, elastin, albumin, globulin-like proteins, and nonstructural proteins that are not essential for leather making.

== Primitive practices ==
One of the earliest references to puering is found in the old rabbinic Minor tractate, Kallah Rabbati (end of chapter 7): "What is the reason that dogs were privileged to have books of the Law and doorpost scripts prepared from their excrement? It is because it says [of them]: 'not a dog shall bark against any of the people of Israel' (Exo. 11:7)." A record of primitive tanning bequeathed in the 12th century by Abraham ben Isaac of Narbonne (1085–1158) mentions the tanning method employed in his day, in southern France, where the treatment of the rawhide by puering was still in use and done after the hairs of the animal were removed by lime in preparation for writing a Torah scroll and the hide had once again become stiff:

After taking dry [sheep]-skins whose wool had been soaked [in lime water for removal], they leave them in the water for the duration of time needed for them to become soft [=soaking]. Afterwards, they put them inside a pit made for them, and they put therein a little dog fæces, having no prescribed quantity [=puering], and a little salt [is added thereto], and then they seal the mouth of the pit, leaving it there for one day in summer months, and three days in winter months, no longer [than the duration of that time], so that they be not eaten up. They then remove them and check them for holes, and if there be a hole found, they sew it, and then lay them out over a wooden frame that is prepared in advance [for this purpose] and they rinse them thoroughly with running water [=drenching], and then bring out a heaping batch of gallnuts which they then pound or grind thoroughly. They then put on each sheet of leather three litres of the Baghdad measure, and plaster thereon the gallnuts, over its two sides, and sprinkle a little water over them, and they put more gallnuts on that side of the leather where the hairs once were (grain layer) than what they do on the flesh-side [of the leather], doing likewise with each sheet of leather, the application [of gallnuts] made twice daily, while, on the third application, they once more plaster with what remains of the gallnuts [onto the leather] and lay it out in the sun, for the duration of time that it takes for it to whiten, leaving it in that state until it dries [=tanning]. They afterwards shake-off the excess gallnuts and then cut the leather.

Tanners in Egypt in the 12th century and in Yemen of late made use of different methods in varying degrees, yet without the use of puering and bating, and without the use of gallnuts. Rather, after soaking and fleshing, tanners utilized the tannins found in the ground leaves and crushed tender stems of Acacia (Acacia etbaica and Acacia nilotica kraussiana), (Note: Quote: "When one takes up a complete rawhide, and begins to work it [as is customary], meaning, salting it and rubbing it down with [barley] flour, and applying an astringent tanning agent to it, he is left with what is called [in Hebrew] ğawīl, being a full grain and unshaved piece of leather. And if he were to split the leather horizontally, throughout the places where it is thick, just as they do when they prepare parchment, when separating from it the thin part nearest to the place of the wool of the animal (grain-side)... that thin piece of leather is called [in Hebrew] duksustos (=membrane), while the other part taken from it, being the thicker side, is what they prepare from it al-req [in Arabic], being what is called [in Hebrew] qalaf (=split parchment), on the condition that they completely treat [the leather], by first salting it, rubbing it down with [barley] flour, and applying to it an astringent tanning agent... Those split parchments found in our day, whose forms are readily known, are forbidden to be used for writing anything, whether a Torah scroll, Tefillin or Mezuzah, since they are hides that have not been treated with a complete and proper treatment, [and] since they have not been worked with tannins. If, however, they worked [these hides] with an astringent substance, such as gallnuts or Acacia [leaves], and similar things, they shall then attain to the name 'split parchment' and it can be written upon, whether a Torah scroll, or Tefillin or a Mezuzah. All this, mind you, when they write on the side of the leather that once clung to the flesh (i.e. flesh-side)." [End Quote]) with which a bath solution was made and the raw hides inserted and left there for about two weeks, constantly stirring and changing the water after one week. In some places in Yemen, the leaves of African rue (Peganum harmala) were used instead of Acacia leaves. In Yemen and Ethiopia, castor-bean oil derived from the castor plant (Ricinus communis) was applied by some tanners to the finished leather product which gave additional softness and suppleness to the leather.

== Bibliography ==
- Heidemann, E. (1993). Fundamentals of Leather Manufacture. Eduard Roether KG. ISBN 3-7929-0206-0.
- Kamini, N.R.; Hemachander, C.; Sandana Mala, J. Geraldine; Puvanakrishnan, R. (1999). "Microbial enzyme technology as an alternative to conventional chemicals in leather industry". Current Science. 77 (1): 80–86. JSTOR 24102916.
- Maimonides (1989). Jehoshua Blau (ed.). R. Moses b. Maimon Responsa (in Hebrew). Vol. 2. Jerusalem: Meḳitse nirdamim / Rubin Mass Ltd. OCLC 78411726.
- Nabholz, Jürg (1935). Einflüsse auf die Wirksamkeit von Beizen und deren Wertbestimmung mit Hilfe der kollagenen Hautfaser (Influences on the effectiveness of microbial dressings and their value determination using the collagen skin fiber) (in German). Darmstadt: Eduard Roether. OCLC 63367076.
- Qafih, Y. (1985), "Hil. Tefillin, u'Mezuzzah weSefer Torah", Mishne Torah (in Hebrew), vol. 2, Kiryat-Ono: Mekhon mishnat ha-Rambam, OCLC 19158717
- Schwimmer, Sigmund (1954). "Industrial Production and Utilization of Enzymes from Flowering Plants". Economic Botany. 8 (2). Springer: 99–113. Bibcode:1954EcBot...8...99S. doi:10.1007/BF02984724. JSTOR 4287800. S2CID 23269748.
- Staff (1987). "Words to Remember". Archaeology. 40 (2): 25. JSTOR 41731856.
- Uhlig, H. (1970), "Die Entwicklung der technischen Enzymchemie (The development of technical enzyme chemistry)", Naturwissenschaften (The natural sciences) (in German), vol. 57, Springer, pp. 261–267, doi:10.1007/BF00609372, PMID 4912677, S2CID 20267178
- Wood, Joseph Turney (1912). The Puering, Bating, and Drenching of Skins. London: Spon. OCLC 9336160. (reprinted in 2015, OCLC 990122261)
