= Liming (leather processing) =

Process for parchment or leather processing

Liming is a process used for parchment or leather processing, in which hides are soaked in an alkali solution. It is performed using a drum and paddle or a pit. Its objectives are:

- Removal of interfibrillary proteins.
- Removal of keratin proteins.
- Collagen swelling due to the alkaline pH.
- Collagen fibre bundle splitting.
- Removal of natural grease and fats

Liming operations of cattle hides usually last 18 hours and are generally associated with the alkaline phase of beamhouse operations.

== Removal of interfibrillary proteins ==
The interfibrillary proteins are denatured by the presence of alkali (particularly sodium sulfide), rendered soluble, facilitating their removal from the leather. Removal is done by the mechanical action of liming or reliming, but more prominently when the pelt is deswelled (during deliming). Failure to remove these proteins results in a hard, tinny leather (due to fibre glueing upon drying) that is brittle and inflexible.

== Keratin removal ==
Keratin that is present in the hair, scales and in the epidermis of the skin is hydrolyzed in the presence of alkali (at pH values greater than 11.5). The disulfide bridges found in keratin protein are cleaved but can be reformed. Long periods of liming will result in hair removal. The main removal of keratin is performed during the unhairing operation. In traditional processing, liming and unhairing were indivisible and took place at the same time. During modern liming methods, and in particular the processing of sheepskins, the hair is removed first and then limed in a liming drum. In hair-save technology, the hides are unhaired first and then limed for a further 12–18 hours.

== Alkaline collagen swelling ==
The presence of calcium hydroxide results in the alkaline swelling of skin. The result is an influx of water into the hide/skin, and a marked increase in fibre diameter and fibre shortening. The thickness of the skin increases, but the surface area of the pelt decreases. The weight increase, owing to the uptake of water, results in a doubling of the hide/skin weight. However, this weight also needs to take into consideration that proteins (especially the hair) have been removed, and the fleshing operation is often performed after liming.

== Collagen fibre bundle splitting ==
The action of liming, in particular the swelling of the skin, results in the splitting of the fibre bundle sheath. Owing to the fibre diameter increasing, the bundle sheath cannot contain the thicker fibres, and it bursts open. This allows increased access to the fibres, which allows better tanning, retanning, dyeing and fatliquoring.
