= Deliming =

Process in leather processing

The deliming operation in leather processing is a drum/paddle or pit based operation where two main objectives are met:

- Removal of alkali from the pelt and the consequent deswelling of the fibres.
- Lowering of the liquor pH to the values used in the bating process.

Deliming operations of cattle hides usually last two hours and are generally associated with the alkaline phase of beamhouse operations. The progress of deliming in pelts is monitored by the checking of pH values of process liquors and in the cutting of a pelt cross-section. Phenolphthalein is used to monitor deliming pelt cross-sectional progress.

== Removal of pelt alkali and deswelling ==
- As an acid is added it lowers the pH value of the internal pelt solution. This neutralizes the solution alkalinity. The lowering of the pH results in rapid protonation of the collagen basic groups.

== Lowering of liquor pH ==
- The acid present in the deliming agents neutralizes the process liquor pH. Typical values after effective, thorough deliming will range from 6 to 9. Ammonium salt deliming pH values should be pH 8 to 9.

== Deliming types ==
The deliming process can be done with acids that can be rapid in their pH adjustment. Buffering salts like ammonium salts predominated the 20th century. Ammonium sulfate and ammonium chloride can be used as deliming agents and they follow the following chemistry:

(NH_{4})SO_{4} → NH^{+}_{4} (ammonium) + SO^{2−}_{4} (sulfate)

The ammonium ion is then free to penetrate the pelt cross-section and further ionise to act as an acid:

NH^{+}_{4} (ammonium) + H_{2}O → NH_{3} (ammonia) + H_{3}O^{+} (hydronium)

The protons can then serve two functions, namely to protonate basic groups of the collagen and neutralize solution alkali chemicals.

Other weak acids can be used such as boric acid, acetic acid, formic acid, lactic acid, phosphoric acid and carbonic acid. Carbonic acid is used in a deliming process called carbon dioxide deliming. Strong acids such as hydrochloric acid and sulfuric acid can also be used but their use is limited.
