= Tanning (leather) =

Process of treating animal skin to produce leather

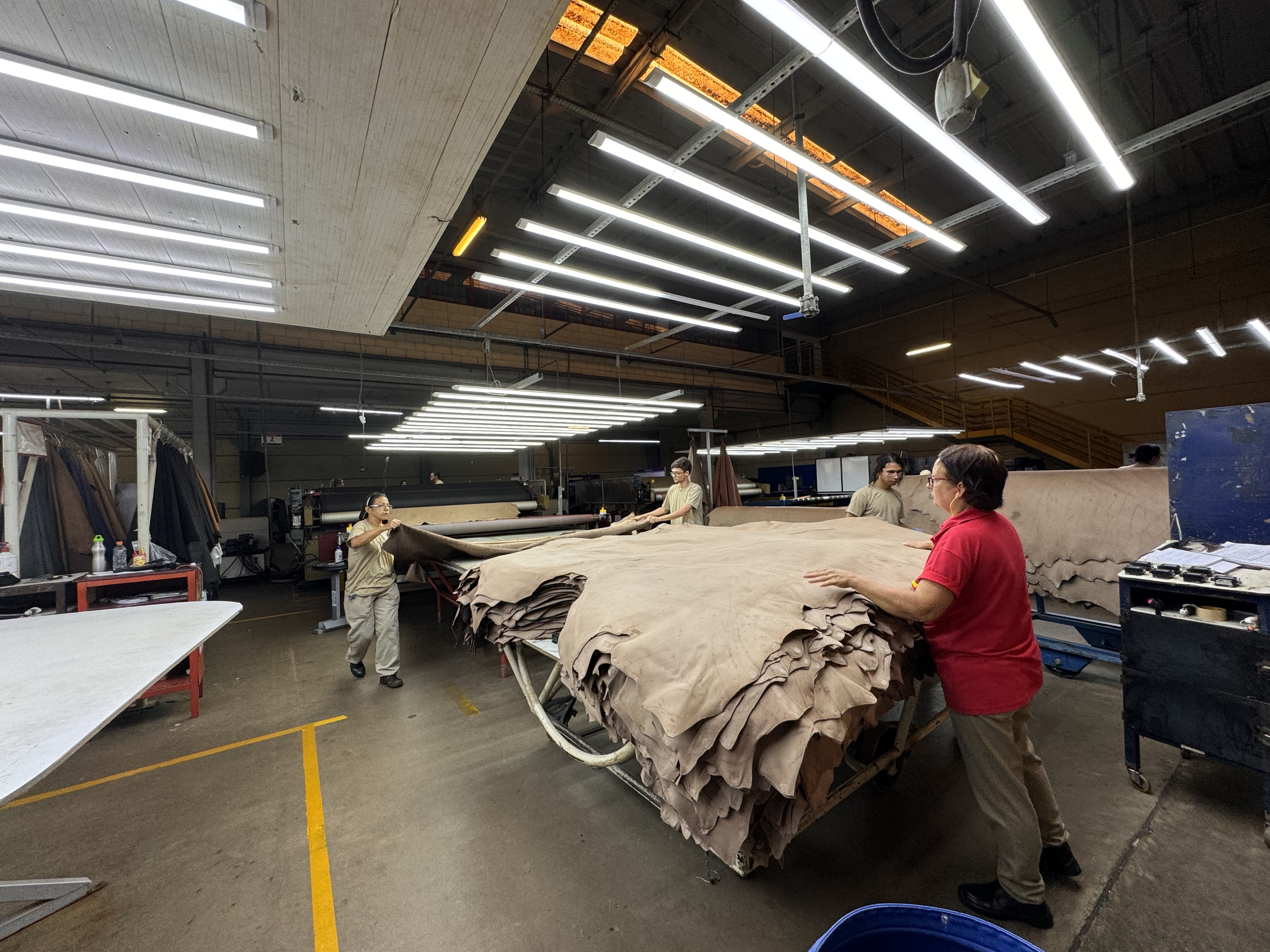
Tanned leather

Tanning, or hide tanning, is the process of treating skins and hides of animals to produce leather. A tannery is the place where the skins are processed.

Historically, vegetable based tanning used tannin, an acidic chemical compound derived from the bark of certain trees, in the production of leather. An alternative method, developed in the 1800s, is chrome tanning, where chromium salts are used instead of natural tannins.

== History ==
Tanning hide into leather involves a process which permanently alters the protein structure of skin, making it more durable and less susceptible to decomposition and coloring. The place where hides are processed is known as a tannery.

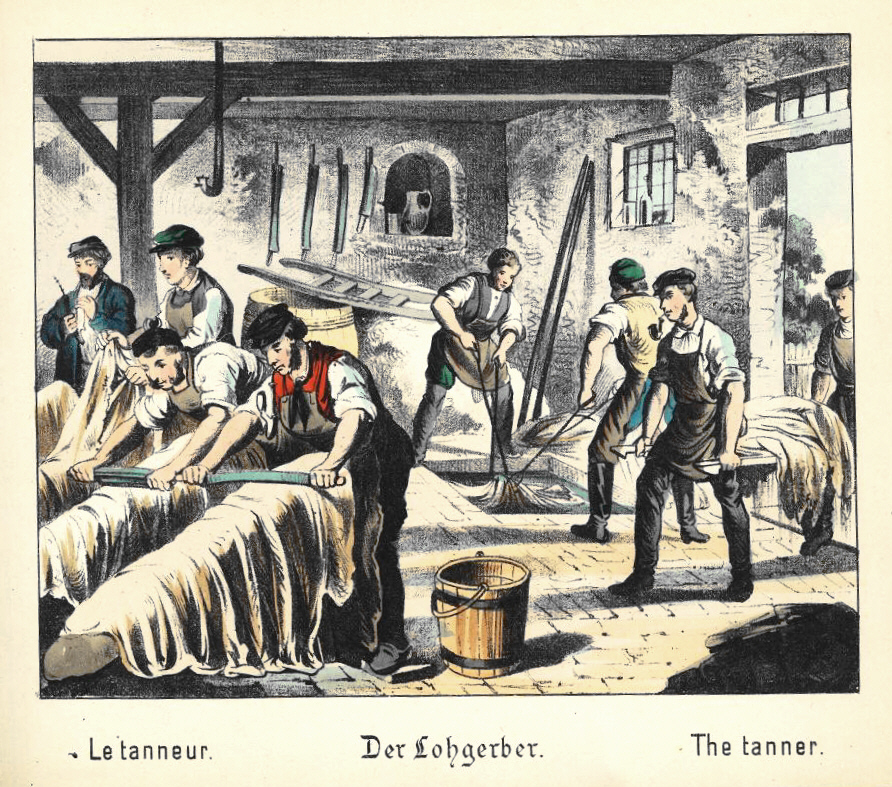
Tanning, 1880

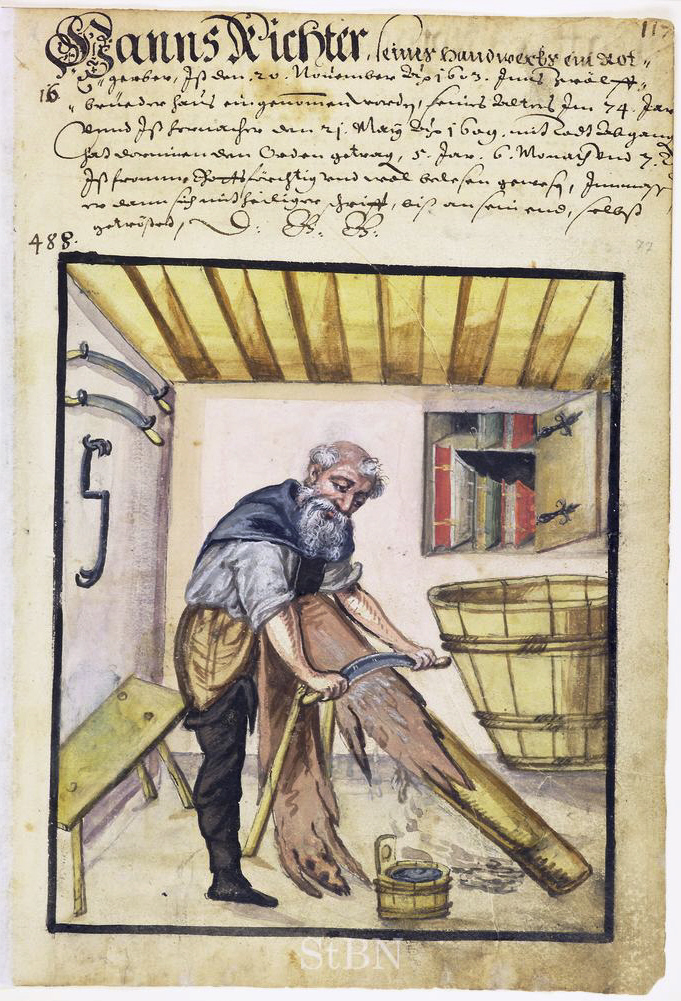
Tanner, Nuremberg, 1609

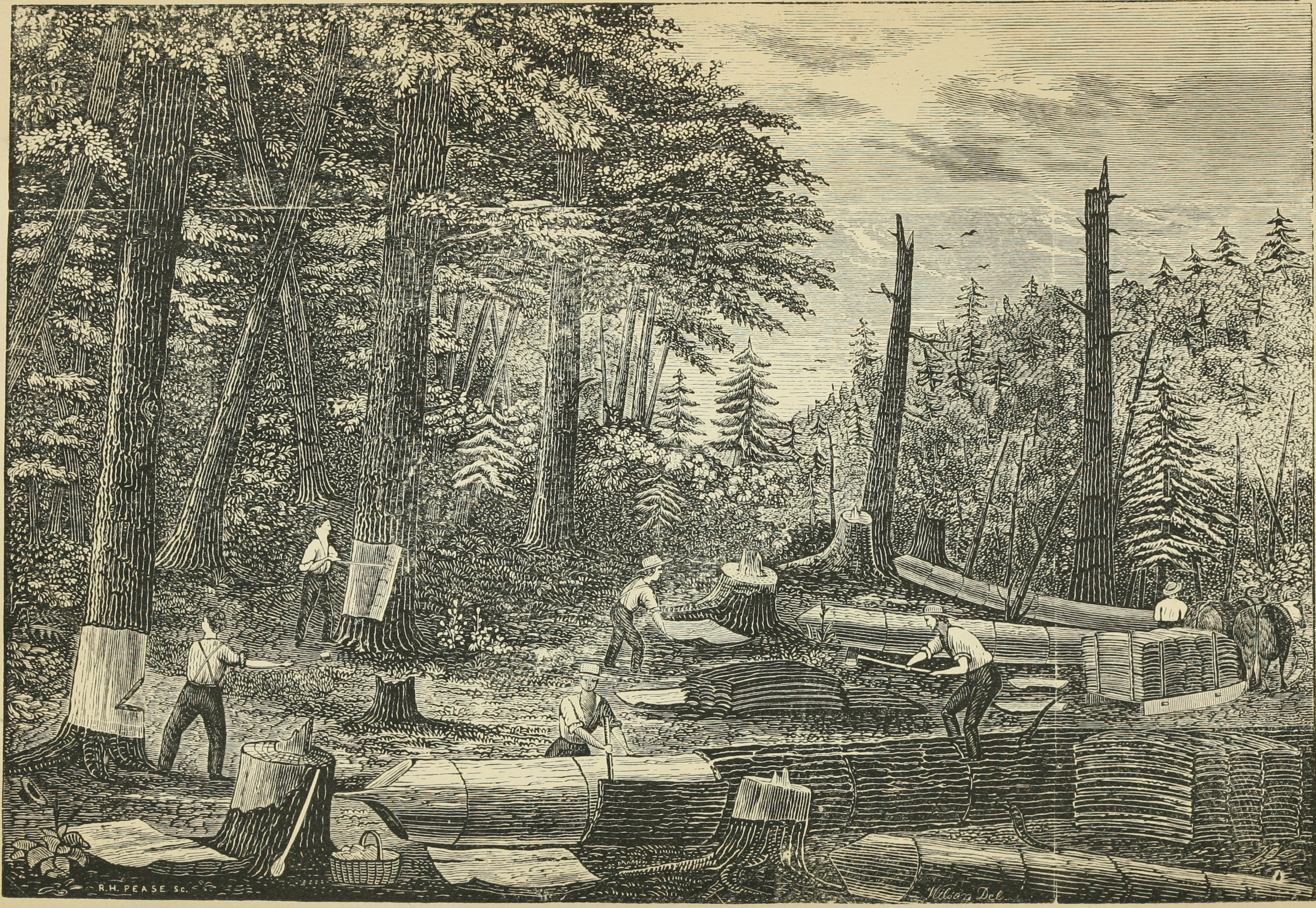
Peeling hemlock bark for the tannery in Prattsville, New York, during the 1840s, when it was the largest in the world

The English word for tanning is from the medieval Latin verb tannāre, from the noun tannum (oak bark). This term may be derived from a Celtic word related to the Proto-Indo-European *dʰonu meaning 'fir tree'. (The same root is the source for Old High German tanna meaning 'fir', related to modern German Tannenbaum).

Hide clothing, footwear, and shelters have been used since the Paleolithic, with evidence of leather working dated to approximately 400,000 years ago; leather working tools from this period being found at Hoxne, England dating to about 400,000 years ago. Extant vegetable oil tanned leather footwear, from the neolithic (c. 5,500-year-old), has been found in Areni-1 cave, of Vayots Dzor province of Armenia and on the remains of the Ötzi corpse, found on the Austria-Italy border.

Ancient civilizations used leather for waterskins, bags, harnesses and tack, boats, armour, quivers, scabbards, boots, and sandals.

Tanning was being carried out by the inhabitants of Mehrgarh in Pakistan between 7000 and 3300 BCE.

Around 2500 BCE, the Sumerians began using leather, affixed by copper studs, on chariot wheels.

The process of tanning was also used for boats and fishing vessels: ropes, nets, and sails were tanned using tree bark.

Formerly, tanning was considered a noxious or "odoriferous trade" and relegated to the outskirts of town, among the poor. Tanning by ancient methods is so foul-smelling that tanneries are still isolated from those towns today where the old methods are used. Skins typically arrived at the tannery dried stiff and dirty with soil and gore. First, the ancient tanners would soak the skins in water to clean and soften them. Then they would pound and scour the skin to remove any remaining flesh and fat. Hair was removed by soaking the skin in urine, painting it with an alkaline lime mixture, or simply allowing the skin to putrefy for several months then dipping it in a salt solution. After the hair was loosened, the tanners scraped it off with a knife. Once the hair was removed, the tanners would "bate" (soften) the material by pounding dung into the skin, or soaking the skin in a solution of animal brains. Bating was a fermentative process that relied on enzymes produced by bacteria found in the dung. Among the kinds of dung commonly used were those of dogs or pigeons.

Historically, many tanning processes used vegetable tanning. In some variations of the process, cedar oil, alum, or tannin was applied to the skin as a tanning agent. As the skin was stretched, it would lose moisture and absorb the agent.

Following the adoption in medicine of soaking gut sutures in a chromium (III) solution after 1840, it was discovered that this method could also be used with leather and thus was adopted by tanners.

== Preparation ==
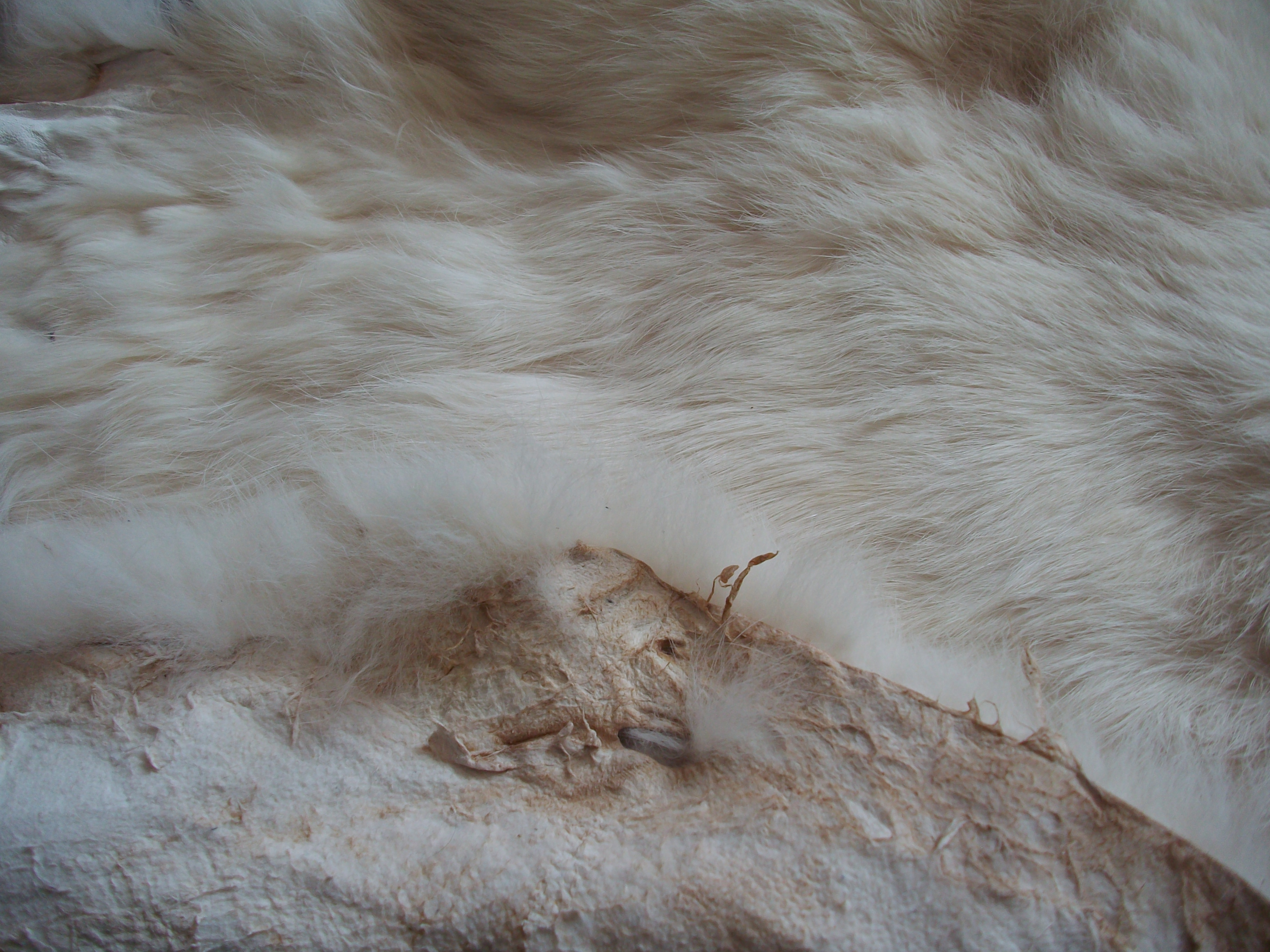
Tanned rabbit pelt. The fur has been left on, apart from small patches exposing leather.

The tanning process begins with obtaining an animal skin. When an animal skin is to be tanned, the animal is killed and skinned before the body heat leaves the tissues. This can be done by the tanner, or by obtaining a skin at a slaughterhouse, farm, or local fur trader.

Before tanning, the skins are often dehaired, then have fat, meat and connective tissue removed. They are then washed and soaked in water with various compounds, and prepared to receive a tanning agent. They are then soaked, stretched, dried, and sometimes smoked.

=== Curing ===
Preparing hides begins by curing them with salt to prevent putrefaction of the collagen from bacterial growth during the time lag from procuring the hide to when it is processed. Curing removes water from the hides and skins using a difference in osmotic pressure. The moisture content of hides and skins is greatly reduced, and osmotic pressure increased, to the point that bacteria are unable to grow. In wet-salting, the hides are heavily salted, then pressed into packs for about 30 days. In brine-curing, the hides are agitated in a saltwater bath for about 16 hours. Curing can also be accomplished by preserving the hides and skins at very low temperatures.

== Beamhouse operations ==
The steps in the production of leather between curing and tanning are collectively referred to as beamhouse operations. They include, in order, soaking, liming, removal of extraneous tissues (unhairing, scudding and fleshing), deliming, bating or puering, drenching, and pickling.

=== Soaking ===
In soaking, the hides are soaked in clean water to remove the salt left over from curing and increase the moisture so that the hide or skin can be further treated.

To prevent damage of the skin by bacterial growth during the soaking period, biocides, typically dithiocarbamates, may be used. Fungicides such as TCMTB may also be added later in the process, to protect wet leathers from mold growth. After 1980, the use of pentachlorophenol and mercury-based biocides and their derivatives was forbidden.

=== Liming ===
After soaking, the hides are treated with milk of lime (a basic agent) typically supplemented by "sharpening agents" (disulfide reducing agents) such as sodium sulfide, cyanides, amines, etc.

This:

- Removes the hair and other keratinous matter
- Removes some of the interfibrillary soluble proteins such as mucins
- Causes the fibers to swell up and split up to the desired extent
- Removes the natural grease and fats to some extent
- Brings the collagen in the hide to a proper condition for satisfactory tannage

The weakening of hair is dependent on the breakdown of the disulfide link of the amino acid cystine, which is the characteristic of the keratin class of proteins that gives strength to hair and wools (keratin typically makes up 90% of the dry weight of hair). The hydrogen atoms supplied by the sharpening agent weaken the cystine molecular link whereby the covalent disulfide bond links are ultimately ruptured, weakening the keratin. To some extent, sharpening also contributes to unhairing, as it tends to break down the hair proteins.

The isoelectric point of the collagen (a tissue-strengthening protein unrelated to keratin) in the hide is also shifted to around pH 4.7 due to liming.

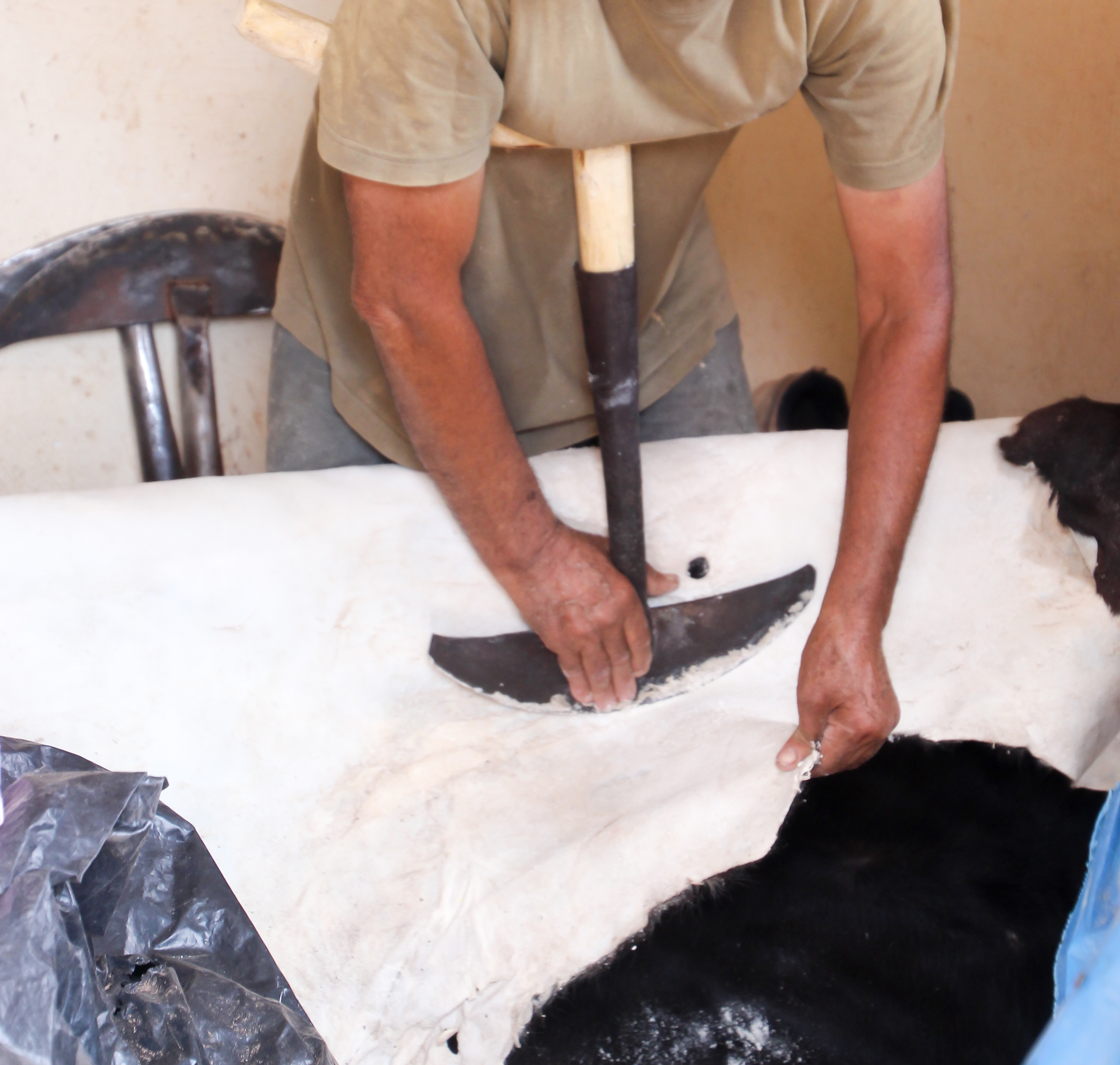
Traditional hand scudding in Marrakech, Morocco

Any hairs remaining after liming are removed mechanically by scraping the skin with a dull knife, a process known as scudding.

=== Deliming and bating ===
The pH of the collagen is then reduced so the enzymes may act on it in a process known as deliming. Depending on the end use of the leather, hides may be treated with enzymes to soften them, a process called bating. In modern tanning, these enzymes are purified agents, and the process no longer requires bacterial fermentation (as from dung-water soaking) to produce them.

=== Pickling ===
Pickling is another term for tanning, or what is the modern equivalent of turning rawhide into leather by the use of modern chemical agents, if mineral tanning is preferred. Once bating is complete, the hides and skins are treated by first soaking them in a bath containing common salt (sodium chloride), usually 1 quart of salt to 1 gallon of hot water. When the water cools, one fluid ounce of sulfuric acid is added. Small skins are left in this liquor for 2 days, while larger skins between 1 week and as much as 2 months.

In vegetable tanning, the hides are made to soak in a bath solution containing vegetable tannins, such as found in gallnuts, the leaves of sumac, the leaves of certain acacia trees, the outer green shells of walnuts, among other plants. The use of vegetable tanning is a process that takes longer than mineral tanning when converting rawhides into leather. Mineral tanned leather is used principally for shoes, car seats, and upholstery in homes (sofas, etc.). Vegetable tanned leather is used in leather crafting and in making small leather items, such as wallets, handbags and clothes.

== Process ==
=== Chrome tanning ===
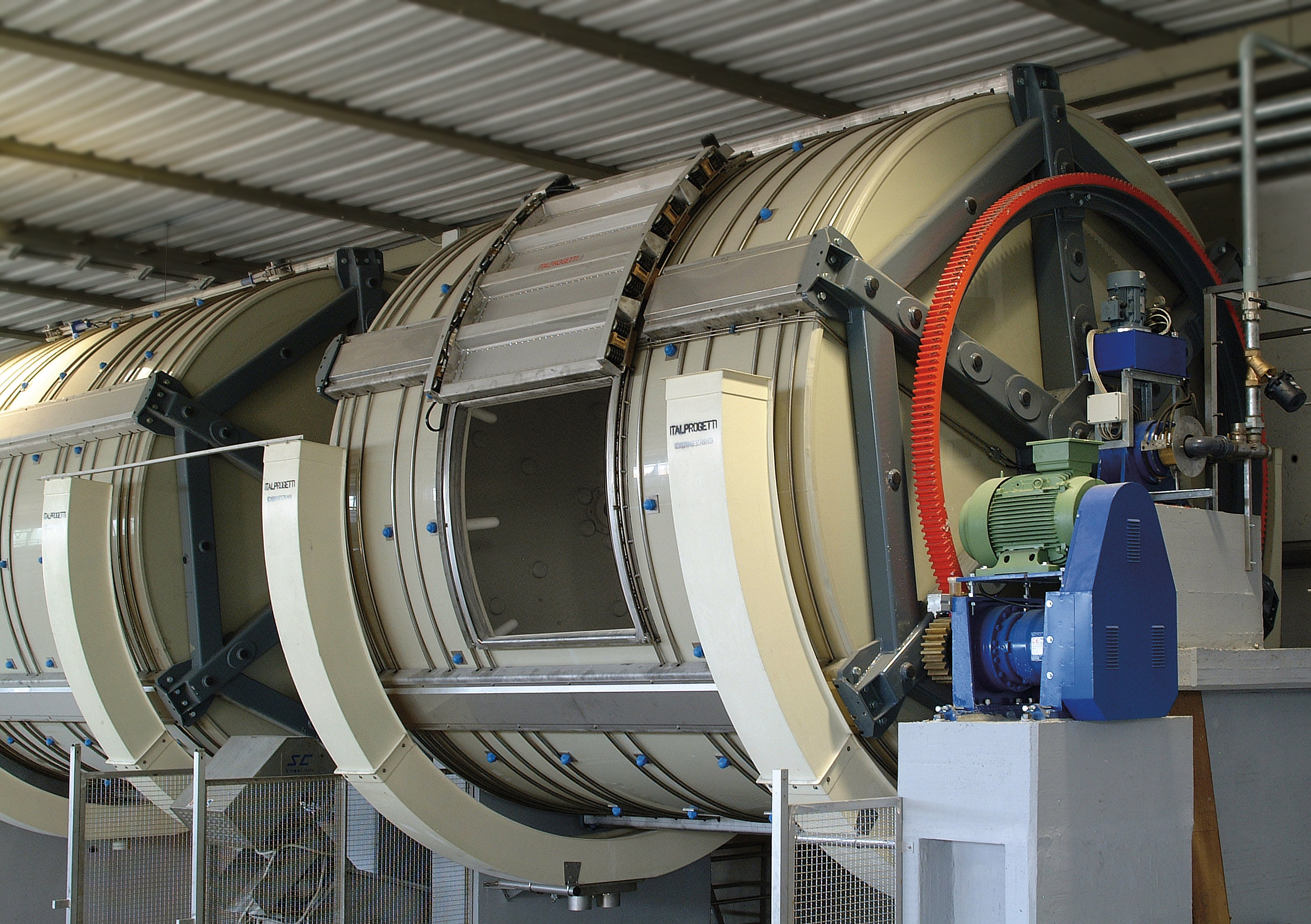
A modern electric tanning drum in Germany

The most common type of mineral tanning is chrome tanning, responsible for 85-90% of modern leather making.

Chromium(III) sulfate ([Cr(H_{2}O)_{6}]_{2}(SO_{4})_{3}) has long been regarded as the most efficient and effective tanning agent. Chromium(III) compounds of the sort used in tanning are significantly less toxic than hexavalent chromium, although the latter arises in inadequate waste treatment. Chromium(III) sulfate dissolves to give the hexaaquachromium(III) cation, [Cr(H_{2}O)_{6}]^{3+}, which at higher pH undergoes processes called olation to give polychromium(III) compounds that are active in tanning, being the cross-linking of the collagen subunits. The chemistry of [Cr(H_{2}O)_{6}]^{3+} is more complex in the tanning bath rather than in water due to the presence of a variety of ligands. Some ligands include the sulfate anion, the collagen's carboxyl groups, amine groups from the side chains of the amino acids, and masking agents. Masking agents are carboxylic acids, such as acetic acid, used to suppress formation of polychromium(III) chains. Masking agents allow the tanner to further increase the pH to increase collagen's reactivity without inhibiting the penetration of the chromium(III) complexes.

Collagen is characterized by a high content of glycine, proline, and hydroxyproline, usually in the repeat -gly-pro-hypro-gly-. These residues give rise to collagen's helical structure. Collagen's high content of hydroxyproline allows cross-linking by hydrogen bonding within the helical structure. Ionized carboxyl groups (RCO_{2}^{−}) are formed by the action of hydroxide. This conversion occurs during the liming process, before introduction of the tanning agent (chromium salts). Later during pickling, collagen carboxyl groups are temporarily protonated for ready transport of chromium ions. During basification step of tanning, the carboxyl groups are ionized and coordinate as ligands to the chromium(III) centers of the oxo-hydroxide clusters.

Tanning increases the spacing between protein chains in collagen from 10 to 17 Å. The difference is consistent with cross-linking by polychromium species, of the sort arising from olation and oxolation.

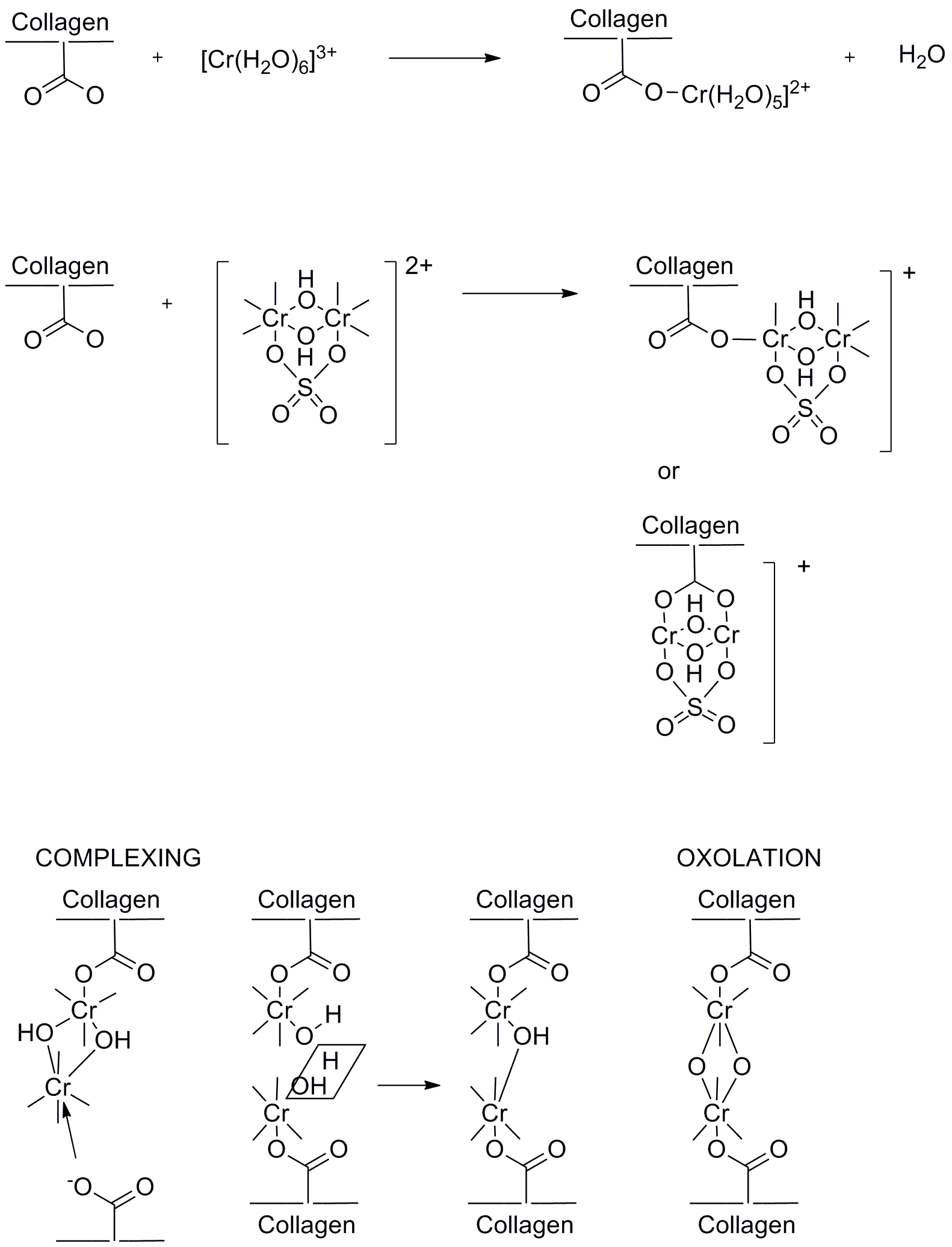
Possible chromium(III) tanning mechanisms

Before the introduction of the basic chromium species in tanning, several steps are required to produce a tannable hide. The pH must be very acidic when the chromium is introduced to ensure that the chromium complexes are small enough to fit between the fibers and residues of the collagen. Once the desired level of penetration of chrome into the substance is achieved, the pH of the material is raised again to facilitate the process. This step is known as basification. In the raw state, chrome-tanned skins are greyish-blue, so are referred to as wet blue. Chrome tanning is faster than vegetable tanning (taking less than a day for this part of the process) and produces a stretchable leather which is excellent for use in handbags and garments.

After application of the chromium agent, the bath is treated with sodium bicarbonate in the basification process to increase the pH to 3.8–4.0, inducing cross-linking between the chromium and the collagen. The pH increase is normally accompanied by a gradual temperature increase up to 40 °C. Chromium's ability to form such stable bridged bonds explains why it is considered one of the most effective tanning compounds. Chromium-tanned leather can contain between 4 and 5% of chromium. This efficiency is characterized by its increased hydrothermal stability of the skin, and its resistance to shrinkage in heated water.

=== Vegetable tanning ===
Vegetable tanning uses tannins (a class of polyphenol astringent chemicals), which occur naturally in the bark and leaves of many plants. Tannins bind to the collagen proteins in the hide and coat them, causing them to become less water-soluble and more resistant to bacterial attack. The process also causes the hide to become more flexible. The primary barks processed in bark mills and used in modern times are chestnut, oak, redoul, tanoak, hemlock, quebracho, mangrove, wattle (acacia; see catechol), and myrobalans from Terminalia spp., such as Terminalia chebula. In Ethiopia, the combined vegetable oils of Niger seed (Guizotia abyssinica) and flaxseeds were used in treating the flesh side of the leather, as a means of tawing, rather than of tanning. In Yemen and Egypt, hides were tanned by soaking them in a bath containing the crushed leaves and bark of the Salam acacia (Vachellia flava, Vacellia nilotica kraussiana). Hides that have been stretched on frames are immersed for several weeks in vats of increasing concentrations of tannin. Vegetable-tanned hide is not very flexible. It is used for luggage, furniture, footwear, belts, and other clothing accessories.

=== Alternative chemicals ===
Wet white is a term used for leathers produced using alternative tanning methods that produce an off-white colored leather. Like wet blue, wet white is also a semifinished stage. Wet white can be produced using aldehydes, aluminum, zirconium, titanium, or iron salts, or a combination thereof. Concerns with the toxicity and environmental impact of any chromium (VI) that may form during the tanning process have led to increased research into more efficient wet white methods.

=== Natural tanning ===
The conditions present in bogs, including highly acidic water, low temperature, and a lack of oxygen, combine to preserve but severely tan the skin of bog bodies.

=== Tawing ===
Tawing is a method that uses alum and other aluminium salts, generally in conjunction with binders such as egg yolk, flour, or other salts. The hide is tawed by soaking in a warm potash alum and salts solution, between 20 and 30 °C (68 and 86 °F). The process increases the hide's pliability, stretchability, softness, and quality. Then, the hide is air dried (crusted) for several weeks, which allows it to stabilize.

The use of alum alone for tanning rawhides is not recommended, as it shrinks the surface area of the skin, making it thicker and hard to the touch. If alum is applied to the fur, it makes the fur dull and harsh.

== Post-tanning finishing ==
Depending on the finish desired, the leather may be waxed, rolled, lubricated, injected with oil, split, shaved, or dyed.

== Health and environmental impact ==
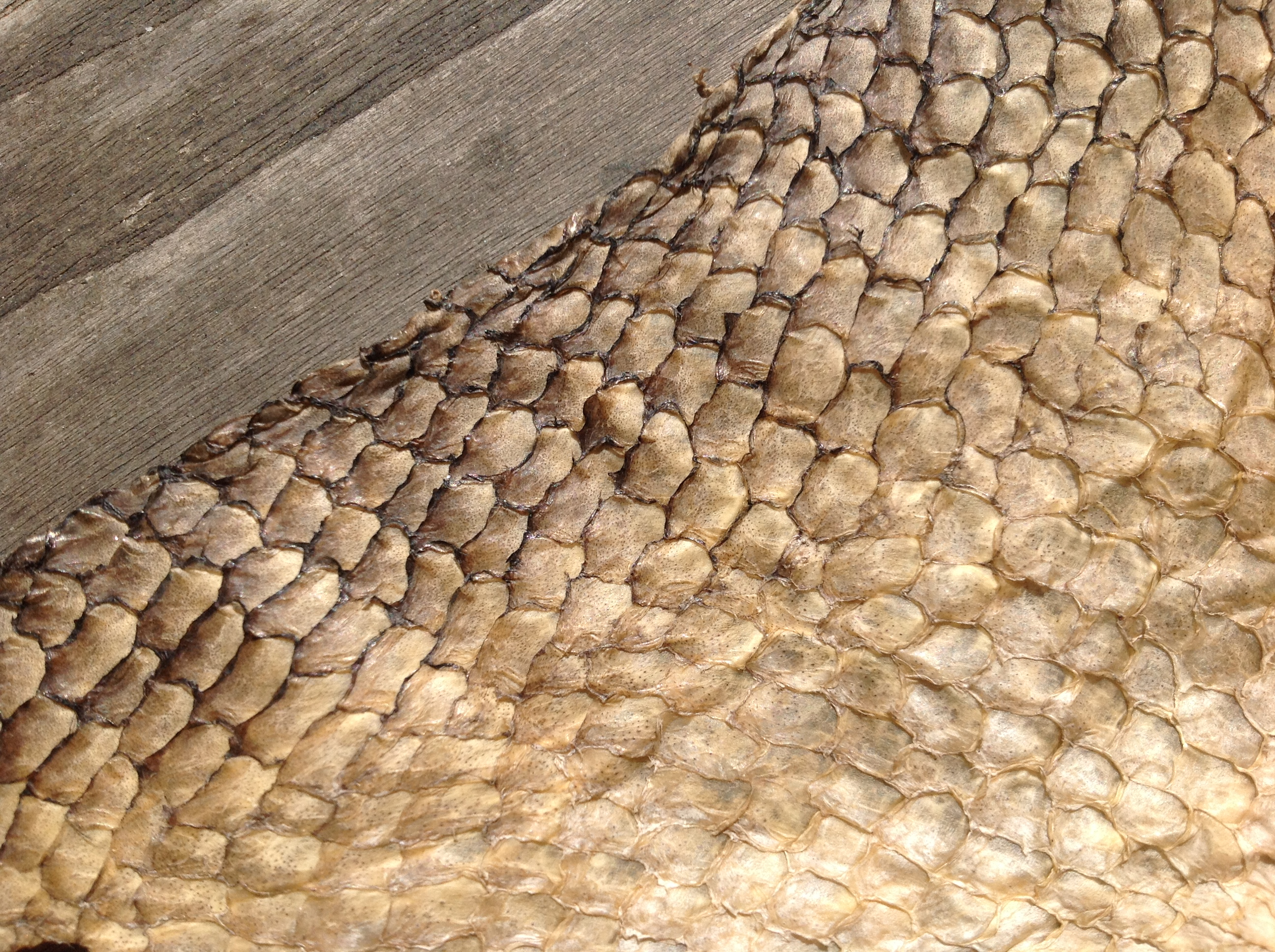
Tanned fish skin of salmon

The tanning process involves chemical and organic compounds that can have a detrimental effect on the environment. Agents such as chromium, vegetable tannins, and aldehydes are used in the tanning step of the process. Chemicals used in tanned leather production increase the levels of chemical oxygen demand and total dissolved solids in water when not disposed of responsibly. These processes also use large quantities of water and produce large amounts of pollutants.

Boiling and sun drying can oxidize and convert the various chromium(III) compounds used in tanning into carcinogenic hexavalent chromium, or chromium(VI). This hexavalent chromium runoff and scraps are then consumed by animals, in the case of Bangladesh, chickens (the nation's most common source of protein). Up to 25% of the chickens in Bangladesh contained harmful levels of hexavalent chromium, adding to the national health problem load.

Chromium is not solely responsible for these diseases. Methylisothiazolinone, which is used for microbiological protection (fungal or bacterial growth), causes problems with the eyes and skin. Anthracene, which is used as a leather tanning agent, can cause problems in the kidneys and liver and is also considered a carcinogen. Formaldehyde and arsenic, which are used for leather finishing, cause health problems in the eyes, lungs, liver, kidneys, skin, and lymphatic system and are also considered carcinogens. The waste from leather tanneries is detrimental to the environment and the people who live in it. The use of old technologies plays a large factor in how hazardous wastewater results in contaminating the environment. This is especially prominent in small and medium-sized tanneries in developing countries.

The UN Leather Working Group (LWG) "provides an environmental audit protocol, designed to assess the facilities of leather manufacturers," for "traceability, energy conservation, [and] responsible management of waste products."

== Alternatives ==
Untanned hides can be dried and made pliable by rubbing and stretching the fibers with a hide stretcher, and fatting. However the hide will revert to rawhide if not periodically replenished with fat or oil, especially if it gets wet. Many Native Americans of the arid western regions wore clothing made by this process.

Smoke tanning is listed among the conventional methods like chrome tanning and vegetable tanning. Impregnation of the hide's cells with formaldehyde (from smoke) offers some microbial and water resistance.

== Associated processes ==
Leftover leather would historically be turned into glue. Tanners would place scraps of hides in a vat of water and let them deteriorate for months. The mixture would then be placed over a fire to boil off the water to produce glue.

A tannery may be associated with a grindery, originally a facility for sharpening knives and other sharp tools, but later carrying shoemakers' tools and materials for sale.

There are several solid and waste water treatment methodologies currently being researched, such as anaerobic digestion of solid wastes and wastewater sludge.

== See also ==
- Tanwater
- Leather production processes
